= Umbria gens =

Ancient Roman family

The gens Umbria, occasionally written Umbreia, was an obscure plebeian family at ancient Rome. Only a few members of this gens are mentioned by Roman writers, but a number are known from inscriptions. Marcus Umbrius Primus was the first to attain the consulship, in the time of Commodus.

== Origin ==
The nomen Umbrius is derived from the cognomen Umber, referring to an inhabitant of Umbria. While this implies that the ancestors of the Umbrii came from Umbria, the largest number of inscriptions from this gens are from Samnium. Alongside Umbrius is found Umbreius. As a gentile-forming suffix, -eius was common among nomina of Oscan origin, and was regarded as equivalent to the Latin -ius, which in some cases replaced it. Thus, Umbrius might have been assumed by someone whose ancestors came from Umbria, and settled in the Oscan-speaking parts of central and southern Italy.

== Praenomina ==
The main praenomina of the Umbrii were Gaius, Marcus, Lucius, and Publius, four of the most common names at all periods of Roman history, which they sometimes supplemented with Titus or Gnaeus, also common names. A few of the Umbrii bear other names, including Quintus and Sextus. This gens also provides an instance of the feminine praenomen Maxima.

== Branches and cognomina ==
The only distinctly hereditary cognomen of this gens is Primus, "first", which appears as the surname of Umbrius Primus, a wealthy farmer in Samnium at the beginning of the second century. He may have been an ancestor of Marcus Umbrius Primus, the first of this family to attain the consulship, around AD 185. Several other members of this family can be glimpsed over the following century, including the consuls Marcus Nummius Umbrius Primus Senecio Albinus, in 206, and another Marcus Umbrius Primus in 289.

A number of Umbrii settled in Roman North Africa, where they appear in inscriptions from the second century onward. Several of these bore the surname Felix, meaning "happy" or "fortunate"; some of this family used related cognomina, such as Felicitas, "happiness", or Fortunatus.

== Members ==
This list includes abbreviated praenomina. For an explanation of this practice, see filiation.

- Gaius Umbrius T. f., buried in a first-century BC tomb at Luna in Etruria.
- Marcus Umbreius M. l. Isidorus, a freedman buried at Rome, along with several other freedmen, in a sepulchre dating from the latter half of the first century BC, belonging to Lucius Cornelius Heracleo, himself a freedman and priest, and his wife, the freedwoman Oscunia Italia.
- Umbreia Auge, named along with Valeria Arescusa in an inscription from Rome, dating from the first half of the first century.
- Umbreia L. l. Utilis, a freedwoman, dedicated a sepulchre at Puteoli in Campania, dating from the early or middle first century, for herself, her tutor, or guardian, Marcus Heius Dionysius, Gaius Marc[...] Rutilio, and Callistus, likely all freedmen.
- Umbria, the mistress of Protogenes, a slave who made a first-century offering to Silvanus at Aufidena in Samnium.
- Umbria Felicula, buried in a first-century tomb at Aeclanum in Samnium, along with Gaius Umbrius Silvanus, perhaps her husband.
- Publius Umbrius Licinus, buried at Bononia in Cisalpine Gaul, in a first-century tomb dedicated by his freedman, Hilarus, one of the Seviri Augustales.
- Gaius Umbreius C. f. Rufus, named in a first-century sepulchral inscription from Gallia Narbonensis.
- Gaius Umbrius Silvanus, buried in a first-century tomb at Aeclanum, along with Umbria Felicula, perhaps his wife.
- Umbreia M. l. Stactes, a freedwoman buried in a first-century tomb at Rome.
- Umbria M. f. Tertulla, buried in a family sepulchre at Bergomum in Gallia Narbonensis, dating from the latter half of the first century, and built by her husband, Gaius Pupius Tiro, for himself, Tertulla, their children, Gaius Pupius Candidus and Marcus Pupius Casto, and Tiro's mother, Alicia Justa.
- Gnaeus Umbrius Cn. f. Clemens, buried at Aletrium in Latium, in a tomb dedicated by his sons, Gnaeus Umbrius Rufinus and Gnaeus Umbrius Quintilianus, dating between the middle of the first and the early second century.
- Gnaeus Umbrius Cn. f. Cn. n. Quintilianus, along with his brother, Gnaeus Umbrius Rufinus, dedicated a tomb at Aletrium, dating between the middle first and early second century, for their father, Gnaeus Umbrius Clemens.
- Gnaeus Umbrius Cn. f. Cn. n. Rufinus, along with his brother, Gnaeus Umbrius Quintilianus, dedicated a tomb at Aletrium, dating between the middle first and early second century, for their father, Gnaeus Umbrius Clemens.
- Umbria Mansueta, buried along with her husband, Gaius Trisimpedius Cogitatus, in a first- or second-century family sepulchre at Suasa in Umbria, built by their children, Trisimpedius Aper, Justus Pudens, and Prudens.
- Umbrius Primus, the owner of several estates in Samnium that produced income to support the children of the Ligures Baebiani in AD 101.
- Sextus Umbrius P. f. Quintianus, buried in an early second-century tomb at Saldae in Mauretania Caesariensis, aged twenty-nine.
- Gaius Umbrius, procurator Augusti in Syria during the reign of Hadrian.
- Umbrius Justinus, named in an inscription from Glemona in Venetia and Histria, dating from the first half of the second century.
- Gaius Umbrius Euphiletus, made a second-century offering to Jupiter Optimus Maximus at Pagus Veianus in Samnium.
- Gaius Umbrius Felix, dedicated a second-century tomb at Beneventum for his wife, Umbria Romana.
- Umbria Romana, buried at Beneventum in a second-century tomb dedicated by her husband, Gaius Umbrius Felix.
- Umbria Sabina, buried at Aufidena in Samnium, in a tomb dating from the middle part of the second century.
- Umbria C. f. Albina, a wealthy woman whose name appears on a water pipe from Rome, made by Lucius Fabius Gallus, and dating from the latter half of the second century. Her name also appears on clay tiles from Aufidena. She was probably related to the consul Marcus Nummius Umbrius Primus Senecio Albinus.
- Titus Umbrius Faustus, together with his wife, Modia Hegemonis, dedicated a tomb at Ostia in Latium, dating from the second century or the first half of the third, for their daughter, Aphrodisia, aged seven years, seven months.
- Umbrius Adventus, built a late second-century tomb at Theveste in Africa Proconsularis for his mother, Umbria Victorina.
- Umbria Victorina, buried in a late second-century tomb at Theveste, aged thirty-five, with a monument from her son, Umbrius Adventus.
- Marcus Umbrius Primus, a native of Compsa in Samnium, was governor of Lycia and Pamphylia, then consul suffectus about AD 185 or 186. About 201 or 202, he was appointed governor of Africa. He is probably the same Umbrius Primus who died before returning from his province, leaving his house to the senator Claudius Hieronymianus. (Note: The Digest includes Ulpian's discussion of Papinian's resolution of several questions of ownership respecting the property that might or might not be attached to portions of an estate. Papinian concluded that the household furniture that Umbrius had placed in a warehouse for safekeeping during his governorship was included in his devise of the house, even though it had been removed from the premises for storage.) He was probably either the natural or adoptive father of Marcus Nummius Umbrius Primus Senecio Albinus, and was a patron of the colony of Beneventum in Samnium.
- Gnaeus Umbrius Primus, built a second- or third-century temple at Aeclanum for Allia Repentina, his wife of fourteen years.
- Gaius Umbrius Abascantus, buried at Beneventum in a tomb built by Servilia, his wife of thirty-five years, (Note: The number is partly obscured, but must be at least thirty-five, and perhaps as much as thirty-nine.) dating from the latter half of the second century, or the first half of the third.
- Gaius Umbrius C. f. Eudrastus, a patron of the colony of Beneventum, by which he was honored with an inscription dating from the latter half of the second century, or the first half of the third.
- Quintus Umbrius, dedicated a tomb at Narona in Dalmatia for Gaius Statius Verecundus, dating between the middle of the second century, and the early third.
- Titus Flavius Umbrius Antistius Saturninus Fortunatianus, a senator buried in a late second- or early third-century tomb at Hadrumetum in Africa Proconsularis, with a monument from his client, Aemilius M[...]esis.
- Umbrius I[...]ato, built a tomb at Luceria in Apulia, dating from the late second or early third century, for Aurelia Feli[...], his wife of thirty-two years.
- Umbria Matronica, a priestess of Ceres, buried in a late second- or early third-century tomb at Cirta in Numidia, aged one hundred and fifteen, (Note: The inscription gives her age as one hundred fifteen years: "v(ixit) a(nnos) CXV"; Hemelrijk states it as one hundred five. One translation of her monument reads: "To the Spirits of the Dead, Umbria Matronica. That which for the other is maturity, for me was only prolonged service to the divinity I served for 80 years. Even barefoot, observing chastity and modesty, I went about earnestly to all the cities of the earth and for this my reward is that the earth receives me with benevolence. She lived 115 years. Here she lies; may she rest in peace." Hemelrijk suggests that Matronica received visitors from all the cities of the earth, rather than having visited them herself: "For many years I have served with religious awe and devotion for the divine power of the deity whom I even served for eighty years with bare feet, pure and chaste; and I have constantly waited upon (visitors from?) the cities of the entire world and therefore I have obtained such merits from the goddess that the earth received me kindly.") having faithfully served the goddess for eighty years. A Marcus Mundicius Saturninus buried in the same place, aged ninety-five, may have been her husband.
- Publiius Umbrius Saturninus, built a tomb at Narona for Septimia Lupula, out of the legacy left by her mother, Septimia Ursina, dating from the late second or early third century.
- Umbria Africana, buried at the site of modern Călan, formerly part of Dacia, aged sixty-five, with a monument from her son, Umbrius Villanus, dating between the middle of the second century and the late third.
- Umbrius Felix, named in an inscription from Lambaesis in Numidia, dating from AD 200.
- Umbrius Villanus, dedicated a tomb at the site of modern Călan for his mother, Umbria Africana, dating between the middle of the second century and the late third.
- Umbria Maxima, dedicated a tomb at Salona in Dalmatia, dating between the middle of the second century and the end of the third, for her mother, Aelia Ursina.
- Marcus Nummius Umbrius Primus M. f. Senecio Albinus, consul in AD 206, then governor of Hispania Tarraconensis, Dalmatia, and perhaps Asia. He was the father of Marcus Nummius Senecio Albinus, consul in AD 227.
- Umbrius Victor, a duplicarius, or soldier entitled to double pay or rations, serving in the Legio III Augusta at Lambaesis, during the reign of Elagabalus.
- Gaius Umbrius Apolaustus, a decurion and quaestor, buried at Beneventum, in a tomb dating between AD 200 and 260, built by his son, Gaius Umbrius Rufinus, and brother, Titus Cominius Felicissimus.
- Gaius Umbrius C. f. Rufinus, along with Titus Cominius Felicissimus, built a tomb at Beneventum for his father, Gaius Umbrius Apolaustus, dating between AD 200 and 260.
- Gaius Umbrius Servilius Justus, great-great-grandson of Justissimus, a decurion of Beneventum, was buried at Beneventum, aged thirty, in a tomb dedicated by his mother, Servilia Varia, dating between AD 220 and 240.
- Umbrius Lu[...], buried at Narona, aged thirty-two, in a third-century tomb built by his wife, Quieta.
- Umbrius Secundus, together with Umbrius Sedatus, built a third-century tomb at Rome for their brother, the soldier Umbrius Valerianus.
- Umbrius Sedatus, a signifer, or standard-bearer, in an uncertain military unit, together with Umbrius Secundus, built a third-century tomb at Rome for their brother, the soldier Umbrius Valerianus.
- Umbrius Valerianus, a beneficarius, a soldier assigned special duties, who served in a cavalry unit in Mauretania Caesariensis, was buried at Rome, aged thirty-six, in a third-century tomb built by his brothers, Umbrius Sedatus and Umbrius Secundus.
- Umbrius Hermes, the freedman and client of Umbrius Successus, along with his collibertus, (Note: A freedman manumitted on the same occasion.) Umbrius Silvanus, dedicated a tomb at Tuficum in Umbria, dating from the third century, or the first half of the fourth, for their patron and former master.
- Umbrius Silvanus, the freedman and client of Umbrius Successus, along with his collibertus, Umbrius Hermes, dedicated a tomb at Tuficum, dating from the third century, or the first half of the fourth, for their patron and former master.
- Umbrius Successus, the patron and former master of Umbrius Hermes and Umbrius Silvanus, who built a tomb for him at Tuficum, dating from the third century, or the first half of the fourth.
- Lucius Umbrius Saturninus, dedicated a tomb at Rome, dating from the latter half of the third century, for his son, Julianus.
- Marcus Umbrius Primus, consul suffectus in AD 289.
- Gaius Umbrius Tertullus, a man of equestrian rank, was curator rei publicae at Thubursicum in Africa Proconsularis in the time of Diocletian.
- Lucius Umbrius Valens, buried at the site of modern Ston, formerly part of Dalmatia, in a tomb dedicated by his wife, Lusia Paula, dating between the middle of the third century and the end of the fourth.
- Umbrius Primus, a grammarian mentioned by Charisius in the second book of his Ars Grammatica.
- Umbrius Felix, buried at Mechera in Mauretania Caesariensis, in a tomb dating from AD 408.

=== Undated Umbrii ===
- Umbria, buried at Mactaris in Africa Proconsularis, aged sixty-nine years, seven months, seven days, and three hours.
- Gaius Umbrius C. f., named in an inscription from Beneventum, along with another Gaius Umbrius, and the freedwoman Tacitia.
- Gaius Umbrius T. f., named in an inscription from Beneventum, along with another Gaius Umbrius, and the freedwoman Tacitia.
- Lucius Umbrius, named in an inscription from Carthage in Africa Proconsularis.
- Marcus Umbrius, along with Publius Umbrius, perhaps his brother, a boy at Aeclanum, and the master of Firmus, a slave.
- Maxima Umbria, (Note: The inscription has the unusual spelling "Maxuma".) made an offering at Pola in Venetia and Histria.
- Publius Umbrius, along with Marcus Umbrius, perhaps his brother, a boy at Aeclanum, and the master of Firmus, a slave.
- Gaius Umbrius C. f. Adjutor, a soldier in the second cohort of the praetorian guard, buried at Beneventum, in a family sepulchre built by his brother, Gaius Umbrius Mansuetus, and Umbria Eucarpia, probably his sister-in-law.
- Lucius Umbrius Apella, named in an inscription from Tibur in Latium.
- Umbria C[...]do, buried at the site of modern Ksar Bou Fatha, formerly part of Africa Proconsularis, aged forty-four years, three months, along with Umbrius Victorianus and Umbria Veia.
- Umbreia Ɔ. l. Chila, a freedwoman named in a sepulchral inscription from Rome.
- Umbria Domitia, along with her son, Pompeius Floridus, made an offering to Juno Caelestis at Sitifis in Mauretania Caesariensis.
- Umbrius Epafroditus, a member of the ship-builders' guild at Portus in Latium. An Umbrius Pullas was also a member.
- Umbria Eucarpia, along with Gaius Umbrius Mansuetus, probably her husband, (Note: Their relationship is not stated in the inscription. As both Mansuetus and Eucarpia share the same nomen, both could be siblings of Gaius Umbrius Adjutor, but the portion mentioning them as parents implies that they were husband and wife. It would not be unusual for them to share a nomen if they or their parents were freedmen of the same family.) built a tomb at Beneventum for Mansuetus' brother, Gaius Umbrius Adjutor. Eucarpia and Mansuetus were also buried there, with a monument from their children.
- Gaius Umbrius Eudrastus Fortunatus, one of the municipal quattuorvirs at Compsa in Samnium.
- Umbrius Faustus, a soldier in the Cohors IV Sugambrorum, an auxiliary unit stationed in Africa, was killed by barbarians, and buried at Tatilti in Mauretania Caesariensis, aged twenty-three.
- Umbria Felicitas, built a tomb at Beneventum for her son, Gaius Umbrius Primus.
- Gaius Umbrius Felix, perhaps a native of Carthage, named in an inscription from Lambaesis.
- Lucius Umbrius P. f. Felix, dedicated a tomb at the present site of Timerzaguin, formerly part of Numidia, for his father, Publius Umbrius Felix.
- Marcus Umbrius Felix, buried at Thubursicum, aged seventy-three, along with Caecilia Spesina, aged thirty-two years, eleven months.
- Publius Umbrius Felix, buried at the present site of Timerzaguin, aged sixty, with a monument from his son, Lucius Umbrius Felix.
- Flavius Umbrius Fortunius, dedicated a tomb at Beneventum for his son, Flavius Aper, aged twelve years, seven months, and five days.
- Umbrius Fortunatus, buried at Mactaris in Africa Proconsularis, aged fifty.
- Gaius Umbrius Fuscus, a soldier in the Legio III Cyrenaica, mentioned in an inscription from Egypt.
- Umbria Helpis, together with the freedman Tiberius Claudius Zosas, built a tomb at Rome for her husband Tiberius Claudius Hermes, the collibertus of Zosas.
- Marcus Umbrius M. f. Juvenalis, buried at Sibus in Africa Proconsularis, aged forty-seven.
- Umbrius Laetus, built a tomb at Lambaesis for his wife, Porcia Vitalis, aged forty-two.
- Gaius Umbreius Lavicanus, made an offering at Aquae Albulae in Latium.
- Gaius Umbrius Liberalis, dedicated a tomb at Folianensium in Samnium for his client, Hyalissus. An Umbrius Polytimus dedicated an altar to the goddess Fortuna for Liberalis' health.
- Publius Umbrius Macedonius, inurned at Rome, in a cinerarium built by his son, Publius Umbrius Philippus.
- Gaius Umbrius C. f. Mansuetus, along with Umbria Eucarpia, probably his wife, built a tomb at Beneventum for his brother, Gaius Umbrius Adjutor. Mansuetus and Eucarpia were also buried there, with a monument from their children.
- Gaius Umbrius Mar[...], buried at Lambaesis.
- Marcus Umbrius Numisianus, buried at Rome, in a tomb built by Fabia Montana.
- Publius Umbrius P. f. Philippus, built a cinerarium at Rome for his father, Publius Umbrius Macedonius.
- Umbrius Polytimus, dedicated an altar for the goddess Fortuna at Folianensium for the health of Gaius Umbrius Liberalis.
- Gaius Umbrius Primus, built a tomb at Beneventum for Spedia Apula, aged thirty-two years, six months, and six days, to whom he had been married for seven years, seven months, and seven days.
- Gaius Umbrius Primus, buried at Beneventum, aged twenty years, seven months, with a monument from his mother, Umbria Felicitas.
- Marcus Umbrius Prota, dedicated a tomb at Auzia in Mauretania Caesariensis for his wife, Luria Virginosa, aged forty-five, and daughter, Umbria Vitalis, aged four years, eleven months.
- Umbrius Pullas, a member of the ship-builders' guild at Portus. An Umbrius Epafroditus was also a member.
- Umbria Rogata, buried at Mustis in Africa Proconsularis, aged eighty-seven.
- Titus Umbrius C. f. Sabinus, named in an inscription from Amiternum in Sabinum.
- Lucius Umbrius Saturninus, named in an inscription from Furnos Minus in Africa Proconsularis.
- Lucius Umbrius Sca[...], named in a pottery inscription from Forum Julii in Gallia Narbonensis.
- Umbria Secundina, buried at the present site of Vitulano, formerly part of Samnium, in a tomb built by Libonius Primianus, her husband of thirty-five years.
- Umbrius Soricius, buried at Thubursicum, aged fifty-seven, along with Mellita Caliathonis, aged forty-five.
- Umbria Tertulla, buried at Sitifis, aged twenty-seven.
- Marcus Umbrius Udsinneus, buried at Thibilis in Numidia, aged fifty.
- Gaius Umbrius Umens, buried at Beneventum with a monument from his wife, Vibbia Marcella.
- Umbria Veia, buried at the site of modern Ksar Bou Fatha, aged fourteen years, five months, along with Umbrius Victorianus and Umbria C[...]do.
- Gaius Umbrius Vibius Numisius Drusus, patron of the religious societies of Beneventum, who honored him with an inscription.
- Umbrius Victorianus, buried at the site of modern Ksar Bou Fatha, aged sixty-nine, along with Umbria Veia and Umbria C[...]do.
- Umbrius Victoricus, a sacerdos, or priest, who along with Aemilia Dativa and others made an offering to Vesta at Thuburbo Maius in Africa Proconsularis.

== See also ==
- List of Roman gentes

== Bibliography ==
- Flavius Sosipater Charisius, Ars Grammatica (The Art of Grammar).
- Digesta, or Pandectae (The Digest).
- Theodor Mommsen et alii, Corpus Inscriptionum Latinarum (The Body of Latin Inscriptions, abbreviated CIL), Berlin-Brandenburgische Akademie der Wissenschaften (1853–present).
- Notizie degli Scavi di Antichità (News of Excavations from Antiquity, abbreviated NSA), Accademia dei Lincei (1876–present).
- Gustav Wilmanns, Inscriptiones Africae Latinae (Latin Inscriptions from Africa), Georg Reimer, Berlin (1881).
- Bulletin Archéologique du Comité des Travaux Historiques et Scientifiques (Archaeological Bulletin of the Committee on Historic and Scientific Works, abbreviated BCTH), Imprimerie Nationale, Paris (1885–1973).
- René Cagnat et alii, L'Année épigraphique (The Year in Epigraphy, abbreviated AE), Presses Universitaires de France (1888–present).
- Stéphane Gsell, Recherches archéologiques en Algérie (Archaeological Research in Algeria), Paris (1893).
- George Davis Chase, "The Origin of Roman Praenomina", in Harvard Studies in Classical Philology, vol. VIII, pp. 103–184 (1897).
- Paul von Rohden, Elimar Klebs, & Hermann Dessau, Prosopographia Imperii Romani (The Prosopography of the Roman Empire, abbreviated PIR), Berlin (1898).
- Stéphane Gsell, Inscriptions Latines de L'Algérie (Latin Inscriptions from Algeria), Edouard Champion, Paris (1922–present).
- La Carte Archéologique de la Gaule (Archaeological Map of Gaul), Académie des Inscriptions et Belles-Lettres (1931–present).
- Inscriptiones Italiae (Inscriptions from Italy), Rome (1931-present).
- Anna and Jaroslav Šašel, Inscriptiones Latinae quae in Iugoslavia inter annos MCMXL et MCMLX repertae et editae sunt (Inscriptions from Yugoslavia Found and Published between 1940 and 1960), Ljubljana (1963–1986).
- D.P. Simpson, Cassell's Latin and English Dictionary, Macmillan Publishing Company, New York (1963).
- Françoise Prévot, Recherches archéologiques franco-tunisiennes à Mactar (Franco-Tunisian Archaeological Research from Mactar), vol. 5, "Les inscriptions chrétiennes", Rome (1984).
- Paul M. M. Leunissen, "Direct Promotions from Proconsul to Consul under the Principate", in Zeitschrift für Papyrologie und Epigraphik, vol. 89, pp. 217–260 (1991).
- Mary R. Lefkowitz and Maureen B. Fant, Women's Life in Greece and Rome: A Source Book in Translation, 3rd edition, Johns Hopkins University Press, Baltimore (2005).
- Inge Mennen, Power and Status in the Roman Empire, AD 193–284, Brill (2011).
- Emily Hemelrijk, Hidden Lives, Public Personae: Women and Civic Life in the Roman West, Oxford University Press (2015).
- Antonio Sartori and Serena Zoia, Pietre che vivono. Catalogo delle epigrafi di età romana del Civico museo Archeologico di Milano (Living Stones: Catalog of Roman Epigraphy from the Civic Archaeological Museum of Milan), Fratelli Lega, Faenza (2020).
