= Arria gens =

Families from Ancient Rome who shared the Arrius nomen

The gens Arria was a plebeian family of ancient Rome, first recorded in the final century of the Republic, and prestigious during imperial times. The first of the gens to achieve prominence was Quintus Arrius, praetor in 72 BC.

== Origin ==
The Arrii were probably of Oscan descent, as their nomen appears to be Oscan. They probably came to Rome some time during the middle or late Republic; Cicero describes the first of the Arrii mentioned in history as a man of low birth, who achieved his station through hard work, rather than by education or talent.

== Praenomina ==
The Arrii of the Republic used the praenomina Quintus, Gaius, and Marcus. Gnaeus occurs in imperial times.

== Branches and cognomina ==
None of the Arrii during the Republic bore any cognomen. In imperial times, we find the surnames Gallus, Varus, and Aper. Gallus and Aper belong to a widespread class of surnames derived from familiar objects and animals; Aper signified a wild boar, while Gallus refers to a cockerel, although it could also refer to a Gaul, indicating someone of Gallic descent or association. Varus, "knock-kneed", was originally given to someone whose legs were turned inward.

== Members ==
This list includes abbreviated praenomina. For an explanation of this practice, see filiation.

- Quintus Arrius, praetor in 73 BC, and apparently propraetor in the following year, during the Third Servile War. He inflicted a devastating defeat against Crixus, but was in turn defeated by Spartacus. He died while on his way to take up the government of Sicily.
- Quintus Arrius Q. f., a friend of Cicero, sought the consulship in 59 BC, but was unsuccessful.
- Gaius Arrius, a neighbor of Cicero at Formiae, whose persistent company in 59 BC proved to be a nuisance.
- Marcus Arrius Q. f. Secundus, triumvir monetalis in 41 BC.
- Arria, set an example for her husband, Caecina Paetus, whom Claudius had ordered to take his own life. Stabbing herself, she handed Paetus the dagger, claiming that the act caused her no pain.
- Arrius Varus, praetorian prefect in AD 69, following the death of Vitellius.
- Gnaeus Arrius Antoninus, consul suffectus in AD 69, from the Kalends of July to the Kalends of September. He was a grandfather of Antoninus Pius.
- Marcus Arrius Diomedes, a citizen whose tomb was found at Pompeii. It is believed that the massive house down the road from the tomb was his house. He was probably descended from or was a freedman of the Arrii.
- Gnaeus Arrius Augur, consul in AD 121.
- Gnaeus Arrius Cornelius Proculus, governor of Lycia and Pamphylia from AD 139 to 141, and consul suffectus for the months of May and June in 145.
- Arria (possibly Arria Flavia, Flavia Arria or Manlia Arria) wife of Marcus Nonius Macrinus.
- Arria Flavia Veria Priscilla, 2nd-century wife of a man named Acillius.
- Arria, a Platonic philosopher.
- Lucius Arrius Flavius Aper, praetorian prefect, and father-in-law of the emperor Numerian, whom Aper secretly murdered as the army was retreating from Persia in AD 284. Aper attempted to conceal the emperor's death, but when his deed was exposed, the soldiers acclaimed Diocletian emperor, and Aper was put to death.
- Arria L. f., wife of emperor Numerian

== See also ==
- List of Roman gentes

== Bibliography ==
- Marcus Tullius Cicero, Brutus, De Divinatione, Epistulae ad Atticum, Epistulae ad Quintum Fratrem, In Vatinium Testem, In Verrem, Pro Milone.
- Pseudo-Asconius, Commentarius in Oratorio Ciceronis De Divinatione (Commentary on Cicero's De Divinatione).
- Scholia Gronoviana, In Ciceronis De Divinatione (Commentary on Cicero's Oration De Divinatione).
- Gaius Plinius Caecilius Secundus (Pliny the Younger), Epistulae (Letters).
- Marcus Valerius Martialis (Martial), Epigrammata (Epigrams).
- Publius Cornelius Tacitus, Annales, Historiae.
- Aelius Galenus (Galen), De Theriaca, ad Pisonem.
- Lucius Cassius Dio Cocceianus (Cassius Dio), Roman History.
- Aelius Lampridius, Aelius Spartianus, Flavius Vopiscus, Julius Capitolinus, Trebellius Pollio, and Vulcatius Gallicanus, Historia Augusta (Augustan History).
- Eutropius, Breviarium Historiae Romanae (Abridgement of the History of Rome).
- Sextus Aurelius Victor, De Caesaribus (On the Caesars), Epitome de Caesaribus (attributed).
- Joannes Zonaras, Epitome Historiarum (Epitome of History).
- Dictionary of Greek and Roman Biography and Mythology, William Smith, ed., Little, Brown and Company, Boston (1849).
- René Cagnat et alii, L'Année épigraphique (The Year in Epigraphy, abbreviated AE), Presses Universitaires de France (1888–present).
- George Davis Chase, "The Origin of Roman Praenomina", in Harvard Studies in Classical Philology, vol. VIII, pp. 103–184 (1897).
- T. Robert S. Broughton, The Magistrates of the Roman Republic, American Philological Association (1952–1986).
- E. Mary Smallwood, Documents Illustrating the Principates of Nerva, Trajan, and Hadrian, Cambridge University Press (1966).
- John C. Traupman, The New College Latin & English Dictionary, Bantam Books, New York (1995).
- Werner Eck, "Die Fasti consulares der Regierungszeit des Antoninus Pius, eine Bestandsaufnahme seit Géza Alföldys Konsulat und Senatorenstand" (The Consular Fasti for the Reign of Antoninus Pius: an Inventory since Géza Alföldy's Konsulat und Senatorenstand), in Studia Epigraphica in Memoriam Géza Alföldy, Werner Eck, Bence Fehér, Péter Kovács, eds., Bonn, pp. 69–90 (2013).
