= Pomponius Mamilianus =

Roman senator

Pomponius Mamilianus was a Roman senator who held several offices in the service of the emperor. He was appointed suffect consul in the nundinium of May to June 100 as the colleague of Lucius Herennius Saturninus. He is known through surviving inscriptions, and was a correspondent of Pliny the Younger.

His full name is Pomponius T.f. Gal. Mamilianus Rufus Antistianus Funisulanus Vettonianus, as attested in an inscription recovered at Deva. The sources conflict over his praenomen, however. The Fasti Ostienses show it to be "Lucius"; a military diploma shows it to be "Titus"; and the British inscription mentioned above is damaged at that point, and cannot be used to resolve the matter. As for the final element in his name, "Funisulanus Vettonianus", authorities agree it indicates some connection to the general and suffect consul of 78 Lucius Funisulanus Vettonianus, but disagree what connection he has. Some have argued that this is evidence of a Pomponius being adopted by testament by the older Funisulanus Vettonianus, while others have argued he is a son or nephew of the older Vettonianus being adopted by a Pomponius. Olli Salomies concurs with Ronald Syme, and interprets this name as evidence Mamilianus' father or grandfather married a Funisulana, that is a female relative of the older Funisulanus Vettonianus.

== Life ==
The cursus honorum of Mamilianus is incomplete. The inscription from Deva attests that he was the commander of the legion stationed at the Roman fort at Deva, which at the time was Legio XX Valeria Victrix. Anthony Birley notes that "he was in his early thirties" when he commanded the legion, offers a date for this command as "the early 90s", and notes Mamilianus "must have owed this appointment to Domitian."

Copies of two letters Pliny wrote to him have survived; A.N. Sherwin-White dates them to the period 107 to 108. One, written while Pliny was busy with the grape harvest, mentions Mamilianus' love of hunting. The other alludes to Mamilianus living a military life, which has been interpreted as evidence that he was governing a military province, which would also be an appointment at the pleasure of the emperor.

Birley notes that the suffect consul of 121, Titus Pomponius Antistianus Funisulanus Vettonianus, is "presumably" his son.

Political offices
| Preceded by Marcus Marcius Macer, and Gaius Cilnius Proculus as suffect consuls | Consul of the Roman Empire; 100 with Lucius Herennius Saturninus | Succeeded by Quintus Acutius Nerva, and Lucius Fabius Tuscus as suffect consuls |
