= Rupilia gens =

Roman family

The gens Rupilia, occasionally written Rupillia, was a minor plebeian family at ancient Rome. Members of this gens are first mentioned in the latter part of the Republic, and Publius Rupilius obtained the consulship in 132 BC. Few others achieved any prominence, but the name occurs once or twice in the consular fasti under the Empire. The name is frequently confounded with the similar Rutilius.

== Praenomina ==
The main praenomina of the Rupilii were Publius and Lucius, two of the most common names throughout Roman history.

== Branches and cognomina ==
None of the Rupilii bore cognomina under the Republic, but as with other plebeian families most of them had individual surnames in imperial times.

== Members ==
This list includes abbreviated praenomina. For an explanation of this practice, see filiation.

- Publius Rupilius P. f. P. n., a fierce opponent of the Gracchi, became consul in 132 BC, the year after the murder of Tiberius Gracchus, whose followers he persecuted. He brought the First Servile War to a close, then remained in Sicily to reorganize the province, receiving a triumph on his return. He was prosecuted and condemned during the tribunate of Gaius Gracchus in 123, and died soon afterward.
- Lucius Rupilius P. f. P. n., brother of Publius Rupilius, the consul, sought the aid of Scipio Aemilianus to obtain the consulship, but was not elected.
- Lucius Rupilius, an actor known to the young Cicero.
- Aulus Rupilius, a physician employed by Aulus Cluentius Habitus, whose mother, Sassia, bought a slave, Strato, from Rupilius, and had him tortured in the hope of obtaining evidence against her own son. The slave knew nothing of value, and Sassia's scheme came to naught.
- Publius Rupilius, a man of equestrian rank, was magister of the publicani of Bithynia.
- Gaius Rupilius, an argentarius, or silversmith, named in an inscription.
- Lucius Scribonius Libo Rupilius M. f. M. n. Frugi Bonus, consul suffectus, serving from May to August in AD 88. He was the great-grandfather of Marcus Aurelius. His descent from the Rupilii is unclear.
- Rupilia L. f. M. n. Faustina, the grandmother of Marcus Aurelius, married Marcus Annius Verus.
- Lucius Rupilius Appianus, one of the septemviri epulones at Brixia in Venetia and Histria.
- Decimus Rupilius Severus, legate in Lycia and Pamphylia in AD 151, perhaps the same Severus who was consul suffectus at the end of 155.
- Lucius Rupilius Au[...], legate of Sextius Lateranus, proconsul of Africa in AD 176.
- Quintus Rupilius Q. f. Honoratus, of Mactar in Africa, raised to the equestrian order by Severus Alexander.
- Rupilius Pisonianus, curator at Mactar and Mididi between 290 and 293 AD.
- Rupilius Pisonianus, praefectus vigilum of Rome under Constans Caesar.

== See also ==
- List of Roman gentes

== Bibliography ==
- Marcus Tullius Cicero, De Officiis, Epistulae ad Atticum, Epistulae ad Familiares, In Verrem, Laelius de Amicitia, Pro Cluentio, Tusculanae Quaestiones.
- Titus Livius (Livy), History of Rome.
- Marcus Velleius Paterculus, Compendium of Roman History.
- Valerius Maximus, Factorum ac Dictorum Memorabilium (Memorable Facts and Sayings).
- Aelius Lampridius, Aelius Spartianus, Flavius Vopiscus, Julius Capitolinus, Trebellius Pollio, and Vulcatius Gallicanus, Historia Augusta (Augustan History).
- Paulus Orosius, Historiarum Adversum Paganos (History Against the Pagans).
- Desiré-Raoul Rochette, Lettre à M. Schorn, Firmin Didot Frères, Paris (1832).
- Dictionary of Greek and Roman Biography and Mythology, William Smith, ed., Little, Brown and Company, Boston (1849).
- Theodor Mommsen et alii, Corpus Inscriptionum Latinarum (The Body of Latin Inscriptions, abbreviated CIL), Berlin-Brandenburgische Akademie der Wissenschaften (1853–present).
- Paul von Rohden, Elimar Klebs, & Hermann Dessau, Prosopographia Imperii Romani (The Prosopography of the Roman Empire, abbreviated PIR), Berlin (1898).
- T. Robert S. Broughton, The Magistrates of the Roman Republic, American Philological Association (1952–1986).
- Werner Eck, "Die Fasti consulares der Regierungszeit des Antoninus Pius, eine Bestandsaufnahme seit Géza Alföldys Konsulat und Senatorenstand" (The Consular Fasti for the Reign of Antoninus Pius: an Inventory since Géza Alföldy's Konsulat und Senatorenstand), in Studia Epigraphica in Memoriam Géza Alföldy, Werner Eck, Bence Fehér, Péter Kovács, eds., Bonn, pp. 69–90 (2013).
- Jones, A.H.M.; J.R. Martindale & J. Morris (1971–1992). Prosopography of the Later Roman Empire. Cambridge University Press. ISBN 0-521-07233-6.
