= Quintus Arrius =

Quintus Arrius (Latin for 'Arrius the Fifth') may refer to:

- Quintus Arrius (praetor 73 BC), Ancient Roman official
- Quintus Arrius Q. f., son of praetor
- Quintus Arrius, a fictional character in the novel Ben-Hur: A Tale of the Christ and various adaptations
