= Lucceia gens =

The gens Lucceia, occasionally Luceia or Luccia, was a plebeian family at Rome, which flourished during the final century of the Republic and under the early Empire.

== Origin ==
The Lucceii may have been of Oscan origin, as the termination -eius frequently occurs in nomina of Oscan derivation, often alongside -ius as an alternative spelling, as Lucceius occurs alongside Luccius. The name appears to refer to a Lucanian, which would be consistent with such an origin.

== Members ==
This list includes abbreviated praenomina. For an explanation of this practice, see filiation.

- Lucceius, a Roman general during the Social War. Together with the praetor Gaius Cosconius, he defeated the Samnites in 89 BC.
- Quintus Lucceius, an inhabitant of Rhegium, was one of the witnesses against Verres.
- Lucceius, M. f., a correspondent of Cicero, who must be distinguished from Lucius Lucceius, the historian. He was an ardent supporter of the optimates.
- Lucius Lucceius Q. f., the historian, was a friend and neighbor of Cicero. Asconius describes him as a well-spoken orator, who accused Catiline following his unsuccessful attempt to gain the consulship in 63 BC. Three years later, Lucceius and Caesar campaigned together for the consulship, but the aristocratic party prevented Lucceius' election. During the Civil War, he was a close advisor to Pompeius, but he was pardoned by Caesar and returned to Rome, where he probably died in the later part of 45 BC.
- Gaius Lucceius C. f. Hirrius, (Note: Lucilius in Plutarch; Ulcillis in some manuscripts of Caesar.) tribune of the plebs in 53 BC, rashly proposed that Pompeius be appointed dictator. He was defeated by Cicero for the augurship in 52, and by Marcus Caelius for aedile in 51, but Cicero afterward attempted a reconciliation. He was an officer of Pompeius during the Civil War, but was deserted by his troops, and imprisoned by the Parthian king Orodes. He was pardoned by Caesar after the Battle of Pharsalus. (Note: He may be the same person as Gaius Hirrius, the famous farmer of lampreys [see Hirria (gens)], and perhaps the same as the Hirtius whom the triumvirs proscribed in 43 BC, and who fled to Sextus Pompeius for protection.)
- Gnaeus Lucceius, a friend of Decimus Junius Brutus, mentioned by Cicero in 44 BC.
- Publius Lucceius, a friend of Cicero, who recommended him to Quintus Cornificius in 43 BC.
- Lucceius or Luceius Albinus, procurator of Judea from AD 62 to 64, and governor of Mauretania from 64 to 69. A supporter of Marcus Salvius Otho, one of the rival claimants of the empire in the Year of the Four Emperors, Lucceius and his wife were assassinated soon after Otho's downfall.

== See also ==
- List of Roman gentes

== Bibliography ==
- Marcus Tullius Cicero, In Verrem, Epistulae ad Atticum, Epistulae ad Familiares, Epistulae ad Quintum Fratrem.
- Gaius Julius Caesar, Commentarii de Bello Civili (Commentaries on the Civil War).
- Flavius Josephus, Antiquitates Judaïcae (Antiquities of the Jews).
- Publius Cornelius Tacitus, Historiae.
- Plutarchus, Lives of the Noble Greeks and Romans.
- Gaius Suetonius Tranquillus, De Vita Caesarum (Lives of the Caesars, or The Twelve Caesars).
- Lucius Cassius Dio Cocceianus (Cassius Dio), Roman History.
- Johann Caspar von Orelli, Onomasticon Tullianum, Orell Füssli, Zürich (1826–1838).
- Dictionary of Greek and Roman Biography and Mythology, William Smith, ed., Little, Brown and Company, Boston (1849).
- George Davis Chase, "The Origin of Roman Praenomina", in Harvard Studies in Classical Philology, vol. VIII (1897).
