= Marcus Annius Verus (grandfather of Marcus Aurelius) =

Roman senator, grandfather of emperor Marcus Aurelius

- Born: c. 50
- Died: 138
- Office: Consul (97, 121, 126); Praefectus urbi
- Spouse: Rupilia Faustina
- Children: Faustina the Elder; Marcus Annius Libo; Marcus Annius Verus

Marcus Annius Verus (c. 50 – 138 AD) was the paternal grandfather and adoptive father of the Roman Emperor Marcus Aurelius, and father-in-law of the emperor Antoninus Pius.

== Biography ==
Verus was the son of an elder Marcus Annius Verus, who gained the rank of senator and praetor. The Annia gens was ancient. Its first known member is mentioned by Livy as praetor of Setia, in central Italy, for the year 340 BC; the branch of the Annii Veri settled in the colony of Ucubi (modern Espejo) near Corduba (modern Córdoba) in the Roman province of Hispania Baetica. The family came to prominence and became wealthy through olive oil production in Spain. He was close friends with the emperor Hadrian.

He was urban prefect of Rome and was enrolled as a patrician when Vespasian and Titus were censors. Verus was three times consul, the first time as a suffect in 97, then as ordinary consul in both 121 and 126. This is apparently the cause for a "very strange inscription, found on a large marble tablet excavated in the sixteenth century at St. Peter's in Rome" which alludes to this achievement while celebrating his skill "playing with a glass ball". Edward Champlin notes it was likely the creation of a friendly rival, Lucius Julius Ursus Servianus, who also held the consulate three times the last after Verus.

One explanation is that the whole thing is a joke, based on the connection between Verus' known passion for playing ball and the notion of the ball game as political juggling: an elegant, self-deprecating and rather bitter joke, one not wholly complimentary to Verus. The aged L. Iulius Servianus wrote the piece himself, and had it engraved on a marble slab - perhaps accompanying it with the statue of a toga-clad bear playing ball? - and had it delivered to M. Annius Verus on the Kalends of January, 126. When next they met, the two old men started to laugh heartily at the joke. Fantasy perhaps, but this is a very strange inscription.

He died in 138, aged nearly ninety. Marcus Aurelius says in his "Meditations": "From my grandfather Verus, [I learned] a kindly disposition and sweetness of temper". In his elder years, he had a mistress, of whom he expresses gratitude that "I wasn’t raised by my grandfather's mistress for longer than I was".

== Family ==
Verus married Rupilia Faustina (fl. 90 AD), a daughter of the consul Libo Rupilius Frugi and probably Vitellia Galeria Fundania, daughter of emperor Vitellius. Frugi also had another daughter named Rupilia who was the grandniece of emperor Trajan. Verus had at least three children by Faustina:

- Annia Galeria Faustina or Faustina the Elder, a future empress, who married the future emperor Antoninus Pius
- Marcus Annius Libo, consul in 128
- Marcus Annius Verus, father to future emperor Marcus Aurelius

Ronald Syme suggests, based on onomastic evidence, that they had a fourth child, a daughter Annia, who married Gaius Ummidius Quadratus Sertorius Severus.

After Verus the son died in 124, the elder Verus adopted, and, together with his daughter-in-law Domitia, raised their children.

== Nerva–Antonine family tree ==
Nerva–Antonine family tree

Q. Marcius Barea Soranus | Q. Marcius Barea Sura | Antonia Furnilla | M. Cocceius Nerva | Sergia Plautilla | P. Aelius Hadrianus
Titus (r. 79–81) | Marcia Furnilla | Marcia | Trajanus Pater | Nerva (r. 96–98) | Ulpia (Note: Sister of Trajan's father: Giacosa (1977), p. 7.) | Aelius Hadrianus Marullinus
Flavia (Note: Giacosa (1977), p. 8.) | Marciana (Note: Levick (2014), p. 161.) | C. Salonius Matidius (Note: Husband of Ulpia Marciana: Levick (2014), p. 161.) | Trajan (r. 98–117) | Plotina | P. Acilius Attianus | P. Aelius Afer (Note: Giacosa (1977), p. 7.) | Paulina Major (Note: DIR contributor (Herbert W. Benario, 2000), "Hadrian".)
Lucius Mindius (2) | Libo Rupilius Frugi (3) | Salonia Matidia (Note: Giacosa (1977), p. 9.) | L. Vibius Sabinus (1) (Note: Husband of Salonia Matidia: Levick (2014), p. 161.)
Paulina Minor | L. Julius Ursus Servianus (Note: Smith (1870), "Julius Servianus".)
Matidia Minor | Sabina | Hadrian (Note: Smith (1870), "Hadrian", pp. 319–322.) (r. 117–138) | Antinous (Note: Lover of Hadrian: Lambert (1984), p. 99 and passim; deification: Lamber (1984), pp. 2–5, etc.)
C. Fuscus Salinator I | Julia Serviana Paulina
M. Annius Verus (Note: Husband of Rupilia Faustina: Levick (2014), p. 163.) | Rupilia Faustina (Note: Levick (2014), p. 163.) (Note: It is uncertain whether Rupilia Faustina was Frugi's daughter by Salonia Matidia or another woman.) | Boionia Procilla | Cn. Arrius Antoninus
L. Ceionius Commodus | Appia Severa | C. Fuscus Salinator II
L. Caesennius Paetus | Arria Antonina | Arria Fadilla (Note: Levick (2014), p. 162.) | T. Aurelius Fulvus
L. Caesennius Antoninus | L. Commodus | Plautia | unknown (Note: Levick (2014), p. 164.) | C. Avidius Nigrinus
M. Annius Verus | Calvisia Domitia Lucilla (Note: Wife of M. Annius Verus: Giacosa (1977), p. 10.) | Fundania (Note: Wife of M. Annius Libo: Levick (2014), p. 163.) | M. Annius Libo | Faustina | Antoninus Pius (r. 138–161) | L. Aelius Caesar | Avidia
Cornificia | Marcus Aurelius (r. 161–180) (Note: Giacosa (1977), p. 10.) | Faustina Minor | C. Avidius Cassius (Note: The epitomator of Cassius Dio (72.22) gives the story that Faustina the Elder promised to marry Avidius Cassius. This is also echoed in HA "Marcus Aurelius" 24.) | Aurelia Fadilla | Lucius Verus (r. 161–169) (1) | Ceionia Fabia | Plautius Quintillus (Note: Husband of Ceionia Fabia: Levick (2014), p. 164.) | Q. Servilius Pudens | Ceionia Plautia
Cornificia Minor (Note: Levick (2014), p. 117.) | M. Petronius Sura | Commodus (r. 177–192) | Fadilla | M. Annius Verus Caesar | Ti. Claudius Pompeianus (2) | Lucilla | M. Plautius Quintillus | Junius Licinius Balbus | Servilia Ceionia
Petronius Antoninus | L. Aurelius Agaclytus (2) | Aurelia Sabina | L. Antistius Burrus (1) | Plautius Quintillus | Plautia Servilla | C. Furius Sabinus Timesitheus | Maecia Faustina | Junius Licinius Balbus?
Furia Sabinia Tranquillina | Gordian III (r. 238–244)

- (1) = 1st spouse
- (2) = 2nd spouse
- (3) = 3rd spouse
- Reddish-purple indicates emperor of the Nerva–Antonine dynasty
  lighter purple indicates designated imperial heir of said dynasty who never reigned
  grey indicates unsuccessful imperial aspirants
  bluish-purple indicates emperors of other dynasties
- dashed lines indicate adoption; dotted lines indicate love affairs/unmarried relationships
- Small Caps = posthumously deified (Augusti, Augustae, or other)

Notes:

Except where otherwise noted, the notes below indicate that an individual's parentage is as shown in the above family tree.

References:
- DIR contributors (2000). "De Imperatoribus Romanis: An Online Encyclopedia of Roman Rulers and Their Families".
- Giacosa, Giorgio (1977). Women of the Caesars: Their Lives and Portraits on Coins. Translated by R. Ross Holloway. Milan: Edizioni Arte e Moneta. ISBN 0-8390-0193-2.
- Lambert, Royston (1984). Beloved and God: The Story of Hadrian and Antinous. New York: Viking. ISBN 0-670-15708-2.
- Levick, Barbara (2014). Faustina I and II: Imperial Women of the Golden Age. Oxford University Press. ISBN 978-0-19-537941-9.
- Smith, William, ed. (1870). Dictionary of Greek and Roman Biography and Mythology.

Political offices
| Preceded by Gnaeus Arrius Antoninus II; Gaius Calpurnius Piso as Suffect consuls | Roman consul 97 (suffect) with Lucius Neratius Priscus | Succeeded by Lucius Domitius Apollinaris; Sextus Hermentidius Campanus as Suffect consuls |
| Preceded by Gaius Carminius Gallus; Gaius Atilius Serranus as Suffect consuls | Roman consul II; 121 with Gnaeus Arrius Augur | Succeeded by Marcus Herennius Faustus; Quintus Pomponius Marcellus as Suffect consuls |
| Preceded by Quintus Vetina Verus; Publius Lucius Cosconianus as Suffect consuls | Roman consul III; 126 with Gaius Eggius Ambibulus | Succeeded by Lucius Valerius Propinquus; Gaius Eggius Ambibulus |
