= Marcus Umbrius Primus =

Roman senator

Marcus Umbrius Primus (fl. Late 2nd century to early 3rd century AD) was a Roman senator who was appointed suffect consul around AD 185.

== Biography ==
Umbrius Primus was a member of the gens Umbrii Primi which hailed from Compsa (known today as Conza della Campania). After serving as governor of Lycia et Pamphylia, he was appointed Suffect consul around AD 185 or 186. Around AD 201 or 202 he was the Proconsular governor of Africa Proconsularis.

Umbrius Primus is believed to have been the adoptive father of Marcus Nummius Umbrius Primus Senecio Albinus, who served as consul in AD 206, although it has been speculated that Umbrius Primus may in fact have been his biological father.

== Sources ==
- Mennen, Inge, Power and Status in the Roman Empire, AD 193-284 (2011)

Political offices
Preceded by Uncertain	Consul suffectus of the Roman Empire around AD 185/6	Succeeded by Uncertain
