= Marcus Nummius Umbrius Primus Senecio Albinus =

Late 2nd/early 3rd century Roman senator and consul

Marcus Nummius Umbrius Primus Senecio Albinus (fl. late 2nd century to early 3rd century AD) was a Roman senator who was appointed consul in AD 206 with Lucius Fulvius Gavius Numisius Petronius Aemilianus as his colleague.

== Biography ==
Senecio Albinus probably originally came from the town of Beneventum in Southern Italy, where, due to his building activities in the town, he was recognized as the civis patronus (or patron) of the town. The family also had estates in and around Brixia.

It has been traditionally held that Senecio Albinus was the biological son of Nummius Albinus, a half brother of the Emperor Didius Julianus, who was probably condemned to death after his overthrow by Septimius Severus in 193. At some point, Senecio Albinus was adopted by Marcus Umbrius Primus, a member of the Umbrii Primi from Compsa (today Conza della Campania), which had very close ties to Beneventum. (Note: It has also been argued that Senecio Albinus was instead the biological son of Marcus Umbrius Primus, who was later adopted by Nummius Albinus. See Mennen’s Power and Status in the Roman Empire, AD 193-284 (2011), pgs. 112-115)

Senecio Albinus’ career under the Severan Dynasty was remarkable, given his relationship to Didius Julianus. Possibly of Patrician status, he began his career as a Triumvir Monetalis before gaining some military experience as sevir equitum Romanorum turmae primae (or commander of the first cavalry unit). This was followed by his posting as curator of Carthage. Then, around AD 199, he was an imperial candidate of Septimius Severus for the position of Quaestor. Next, he was a legatus proconsulis in Asia before fulfilling the same role in Africa around AD 202, either under his adopted father Umbrius Primus (who was the proconsular governor), or just after his father stepped down from office.

Around AD 204 he presented himself as a candidate of the Emperor for the position of Praetor. Then in the year 206 Senecio Albinus was appointed consul prior. In around 208 or 209, he was appointed the electus ab Augustis ad cognoscendum vice sacra (the officer presiding over judicial cases in place of the emperor), when Severus and his sons were on campaign. Possibly between 209 and 212, Senecio Albinus was the Legatus Augusti pro praetore of the province of Hispania Tarraconensis. This was followed by his posting as imperial legate of Dalmatia, probably from 212 to 214. Finally, he may possibly have been the Proconsular governor of Asia around AD 221 or 222.

From 191, Senecio Albinus had been one of the Salii Palatini, and since 199 he had been a pontifex, a member of the College of Pontiffs. He had at least one son, Marcus Nummius Senecio Albinus, who became consul in the year 227.

== Sources ==
- CIL V, 4347
- Mennen, Inge, Power and Status in the Roman Empire, AD 193-284 (2011)

== Literature ==
- PIR ² N 238

Political offices
Preceded by Marcus Aurelius Antoninus II, and Publius Septimius Geta	Consul of the Roman Empire; 206 with Lucius Fulvius Gavius Numisius Petronius Aemilianus	Succeeded by Publius Tullius Marsus, and Marcus Caelius Faustinus as Suffect consuls
