= Lucius Herennius Saturninus =

Early 2nd century Roman senator and governor

Lucius Herennius Saturninus was a Roman senator active during the reign of Domitian and Trajan (c. AD 81–117). He was suffect consul for the nundinium of May to June AD 100, with Pomponius Mamilianus as his colleague.

The cursus honorum of Saturninus is incomplete; only the two governorships he held are known. The first province he governed, as a proconsul, was Achaea in 98/99 before his consulship. The other province was Moesia Superior, after his consulship from 102 to 106. During his governorship, Trajan's Second Dacian War erupted. It is unclear how Saturninus was involved in this conflict, but his name is one of three legati legiones or legionary commanders mentioned in "Hunt's Pridianum", a papyrus document from the archive of a Roman auxiliary unit stationed along the Danube. This suggests he was involved in this war to some degree.

== See also ==
- Herennia gens

Political offices
Preceded by Marcus Marcius Macer, and Gaius Cilnius Proculus as suffect consuls	Suffect consul of the Roman Empire; 100 with Lucius Pomponius Mamilianus	Succeeded by Quintus Acutius Nerva, and Lucius Fabius Tuscus as suffect consuls
