= Gnaeus Arrius Cornelius Proculus =

Roman senator

Gnaeus Arrius Cornelius Proculus was a Roman senator who held at least one appointment in the emperor's service. His career is primarily known through inscriptions.

The combination of Proculus' praenomen and nomen led Olli Salomies to observe, "Cn. Arrii are, unlike Cn. Cornelii, not numerous at all, but there is Cn. Arrius Antoninus cos. 69 ... and (Antoninus' grandson?) Cn. Arrius Augur cos. ord. 121." Thus Salomies agreed with Edmund Groag that there is a connection between Proculus and Arrius Augur (perhaps the former was the latter's grandson by adoption), as opposed to the possibility that he "was a Cn. Cornelius whose mother (or some other relative) was an Arria."

Only two offices are known for Proculus. The inscription of Opramoas attests that Proculus was the governor of Lycia et Pamphylia at least as early as September 139 until the following year; the same inscription indicates Julius Aquilinus succeeded him in 141.

The other office Proculus held was the suffect consul for the nundinium of May-June 145, with Decimus Junius Paetus as his colleague.

Political offices
Preceded by Lucius Plautius Lamia Silvanus, and Lucius Poblicola Priscus as suffect consuls	Suffect consul of the Roman Empire; 145 with Decius Junius Paetus	Succeeded by Quintus Mustius Priscus, and Marcus Pontius Laelianus as suffect consuls
