= Marcus Hirrius Fronto Neratius Pansa =

1st century Roman senator and official

Marcus Hirrius Fronto Neratius Pansa was a Roman senator who held several posts in the emperor's service. He was appointed suffect consul in either AD 73 or 74. Pansa is known primarily through epigraphic inscriptions.

The origins of the gens Neratia lie in the Italian town of Saepinum in the heart of Samnium. The name of Pansa's father, beyond the gentilicum Neratius, is not known, although experts agree that Lucius Neratius Priscus was his brother. Experts also believe Pansa acquired the name elements "Marcus Hirrius Fronto" from his adoptive father, a member of the gens Hirria; this adoption occurred before the creation of the earliest surviving inscription bearing his name.

== Career ==
Pansa's career in the emperor's service is not fully recorded. His earliest known office was Lycia from 70 to 72, prior to its federation with Pamphylia. A fragmentary inscription recovered from Saepinum allows us to reconstruct his cursus honorum from that point, with his adlection into the patrician class around 73/74. Then, after his consulship, Pansa was assigned in 74/75 to administer a census in a place called regio X: Mario Torelli believed this referred to a portion of the province of Cappadocia, which was at the time being organized; however, the editors of L'Annee Epigraphique note that it could also refer to Regio X Venetia et Histria in Roman Italy, where the Hirrii originated.

This was followed with a commission to conduct a campaign against an enemy most of whose name was lost from the inscription except the initial letter A: either Pansa campaigned in Armenia Major, or against the Alans. This campaign was carried out in 75 or 76. He was victorious in his military tasks, for the inscription attests Pansa received dona militaria or military honors, including the mural crown and camp crown.

Either with his accession to the suffect consul, or between the completion of his campaign in the East and his next assignment as governor, Pansa was co-opted into the Quindecimviri sacris faciundis. It is clear that following his campaign he served as curator aedium sacrarum, either before he served as governor, or after. He was governor of Cappadocia and Galatia from 77 to 80 while they were still a combined province.

== Family ==
Pansa is not known to have had any children, and, to preserve his lineage, resorted to adopting his nephew Lucius Neratius Marcellus, who is referred to in some inscriptions as Marcus Neratius Marcellus.
