= Decimus Junius Novius Priscus =

1st century Roman senator and consul

Decimus Junius Novius Priscus was a Roman senator, who flourished under the reign of the Flavian dynasty. He was a consul in the year 78 with Lucius Ceionius Commodus as his colleague.

According to Olli Salomies in his monograph on Roman naming practices, the form of his name as presented in the first paragraph is not attested in any of the primary sources, but is given "in all standard works"; the most common form is (D.) Novius Priscus. "Junius" only appears in a consular date from Messene. Salomies notes the praenomen "Decimus" "can only be explained if one assumes that he was in fact also called Iunius; the praenomen Decimus is typical of Iunii, but otherwise rather uncommon." To this Salomies adds, "on the other hand, Novius and Priscus clearly belong together." It is possible that Junius Novius Priscus was the son of Novius Priscus, a friend of Seneca the Younger and exiled from Rome for his role in the Pisonian conspiracy, and later adopted by a Decimus Priscus.

The only other office the younger Novius Priscus is known to have held was governor of Germania Inferior; his tenure has been dated by Werner Eck from the year 78 to 82.

Political offices
Preceded by Gnaeus Julius Agricola, and ignotus as suffect consuls	Suffect consul of the Roman Empire; 78 with Lucius Ceionius Commodus	Succeeded by Quintus Corellius Rufus, and Lucius Funisulanus Vettonianus as suffect consuls
