= Hirria gens =

The gens Hirria was a minor Roman family, appearing in history during the final century of the Republic, and in Imperial times. It is chiefly remembered as the result of Gaius Hirrius, a farmer of lampreys in the time of Caesar.

== Members ==
- Hirrius, praetor in 88 BC.
- Gaius Hirrius, possibly a son of the praetor, was the first private person to raise lampreys in seawater stock ponds. He is reported to have spent no less than twelve million sestertii for bait, using the rent from his houses, and to have sold a well-stocked lamprey farm for four hundred thousand sestertii. Although his lampreys were so dear to him that Hirrius often refused to sell them, he is reported to have sent several thousand to Caesar for his triumphal banquets in 46 and 45 BC.
- Gaius Hirrius Postumius, an Epicurean mentioned by Cicero, may be identical with the farmer of lampreys.
- Marcus Hirrius Fronto Neratius Pansa, administrator of Lycia and Pamphylia from AD 70 to 72, and Galatia from 77 to 80.

== See also ==
- List of Roman gentes

== Bibliography ==
- Marcus Tullius Cicero, De Finibus Bonorum et Malorum.
- Marcus Terentius Varro, Rerum Rusticarum (Rural Matters).
- Gaius Plinius Secundus (Pliny the Elder), Naturalis Historia (Natural History).
- Dictionary of Greek and Roman Biography and Mythology, William Smith, ed., Little, Brown and Company, Boston (1849).
