= Titus Pomponius Antistianus Funisulanus Vettonianus =

Roman consul in AD 121

Titus Pomponius Antistianus Funisulanus Vettonianus was a Roman senator active in the first quarter of the second century AD. He was suffect consul for the nundinium of May to June AD 121 with Lucius Pomponius Silvanus as his colleague. Vettonianus is known only from inscriptions.

The family background of Vettonianus is sketchy. Bernard Rémy, in his prosopography of imperial governors of Anatolia, is certain he is not the same person as Titus Pomponius Mamilianus Rufus Antistianus Funisulanus Vettonianus, attested as commander of Legio XX Valeria Victrix, while admitting the two Funisulani are closely related. Besides the similar names, they share the same tribus, Galeria. Anthony Birley speculates that the legionary commander may be the father of our Vettonianus. It is also clear that both of these are somehow related to the Flavian general Lucius Funisulanus Vettonianus, but that general belonged to a different tribe, Aniensis. A fragmentary inscription found at Posta in central Italy mentions a [...]ae Funisulanae T(iti) f(iliae) uxoris, who may be his wife or daughter; if so, it would suggest Vettonianus had some connection to the area.

Prior to his consulate, all we know for certain about the life of Vettonianus is that he was governor of the imperial province of Lycia et Pamphylia. Werner Eck dates his governorship from the years 117 to 120, between the governorship of his immediate predecessor Gaius Trebius Maximus and his consulship; Rémy concurs with these dates.

Vettonianus' life after he stepped down from the consulship is a blank.

Political offices
Preceded by Marcus Herennius Faustus, and Quintus Pomponius Marcellus as consules suffecti	Suffect consul of the Roman Empire; 121 with Lucius Pomponius Silvanus	Succeeded by Marcus Statorius Secundus, and Lucius Sempronius Merula Auspicatus as consules suffecti
