= Marcus Herennius Faustus =

Roman senator and suffect consul in 121

Marcus Herennius Faustus was a Roman senator, who was active during the reigns of Trajan and Hadrian. He was suffect consul in the nundinium of March of April 121 with Quintus Pomponius Marcellus as his colleague.

An inscription on the Colossi of Memnon at Luxor in Egypt refers to a Marcus Herennius M.f. Quir. Faustus Tiberius Julius Clemens Tadius Flaccus, who is likely the same person. Some authorities point to a line at the end of this inscription which has been read as Geta cos and assumed to refer to either Publius Septimius Geta, consul II in 203, or Geta, son of emperor Septimius Severus and consul in 205. If this identification is correct, this inscription would attest to an otherwise unknown consul who lived in the late second century/early third. On the other hand, Werner Eck has offered arguments against a later date, pointing out that the letters in question have also been read as IRISE [...] CETACO, as well as arguing that it would make better sense for this inscription to be carved during the emperor Hadrian's visit in 128.

== Career ==
Assuming the inscription at Luxor refers to this Faustus, his cursus honorum is as follows. He began his career as one of the decemviri stlitibus judicandis, one of the four boards that form the vigintiviri; membership in one of these four boards was a preliminary and required first step toward gaining entry into the Roman Senate. This was followed as sevir equitum Romanorum, or the annual review of the equites. Faustus then received a commission as a military tribune with Legio III Augusta, stationed at Theveste (present day Tébessa). He returned to Rome where he was elected quaestor, and upon completion of this traditional Republican magistracy he would be enrolled in the Senate. Two more of the traditional Republican magistracies followed: plebeian tribune and praetor.

Upon stepping down from the praetorship, Faustus received another military commission, this time as legatus legionis or commander of Legio XIII Gemina, stationed at Apulum in the imperial province of Dacia; Werner Eck dates his tenure as commander of this legion to between the years 106 and 119. Two inscriptions, one an altar dedicated to the god Mercury, independently confirm Faustus as commander of this legion.

Normal practice was to also allocate a province to a senator of praetorian rank to govern for about three years, but much of the rest of the inscription on the Colossi of Memnon, is lost so it is uncertain if that was the case with Faustus. Because priestly offices appear at the beginning of the list of his offices, we know Faustus was co-opted into the Septemviri epulonum, one of the four most prestigious ancient Roman priesthoods, as well as the sodales Augustales.

The rest of his life is a blank except for one event: the inscribing of this text at Luxor. The simplest explanation for this inscription was that Faustus carved it himself, attesting that he had been a member of Hadrian's entourage visiting Egypt in 128. However, there is no reason against the possibility the inscription had been created by one of his relatives or friends after Faustus' death for reasons unknown.

== Family ==
Information about his family is uncertain. A tombstone found at Rome commemorates Marcus Fabius Faustus, the son of a Marcus Herennius Faustus and Fabia Felicia; the Herennius Faustus mentioned in this inscription may be the same individual as the consul, but identification is not certain.

Political offices
Preceded by Marcus Annius Verus II, and Gnaeus Arrius Augur as ordinary consuls	Suffect consul of the Roman Empire; 121 with Quintus Pomponius Marcellus	Succeeded by Titus Pomponius Antistianus Funisulanus Vettonianus, and Lucius Pomponius Silvanus as suffect consuls
