= Quintus Corellius Rufus =

1st century Roman senator, consul and governor

Quintus Corellius Rufus was a Roman senator who flourished during the second half of the first century; he was suffect consul for the nundinium of September–October 78 with Lucius Funisulanus Vettonianus as his colleague. Rufus is best known as a mentor to Pliny the Younger. In several letters Pliny writes warmly of Rufus, noting that he often sought his advice, recounting in one that on his deathbed Rufus told his daughter, "Through the benefit of a longer life I have gained many friends for you, but above all Secundus [Pliny the Younger] and Cornutus."

== Life ==
Because Pliny tells us Corellius Rufus died at the age of 76, we can estimate the year of his birth as AD 30/31. We know little of his life before he became suffect consul. The only incident recorded is that he contracted gout at the age of 32, which he led Pliny to believe was a hereditary condition. Rufus treated it by dieting and "virtuous living" in his younger years, but towards his last years the disease worsened, afflicting all of his body and not just his legs.

After his consulate, Rufus served as legatus pro praetor, or governor, of Germania Superior from 79 to 84. Then either due to his illness, or antipathy to Domitian, he withdrew from public life. Pliny makes it clear that Rufus hated the emperor: once, when Pliny visited Rufus, confined to his bed and suffering, the older man confided: "Why do you think I endure this dreadful pain for so long? I want to outlive that brigand." Pliny was convinced that had Rufus been in better health, he would have participated in Domitian's assassination.

Following the death of Domitian, Rufus returned to public life. Pliny habitually sought his advice. During a discussion about young men of promise before the emperor Nerva, several people praised Pliny. Rufus commented that he had to be sparing of his praise of the younger Pliny, "because he does nothing without taking my advice." Pliny also records that although he did not seek Rufus' advice prior to undertaking the prosecution of the delator or informer Publicius Certus on the Senate floor, he did tell him about his plans ahead of time.

The emperor Nerva appointed Corellius Rufus to a commission tasked with purchasing and allocating land to relieve the condition of the poor. Rufus handled his share of the work aided by one Claudius Pollio.

Corellius Rufus, wracked with pain from his gout, committed suicide by starving himself to death, despite the entreaties of his family and friends. Pliny wrote in a letter to Calestrius Tiro that even he could not change the older man's mind on the matter, "for his decision to die had hardened more and more inflexibly." Pliny ends his letter begging his friend to send him some consolation that is original, "for the consolations such as I have heard and read that come to me unbidden, but are unequal to this great grief."

== Family ==
Rufus was married to Hispulla; her name indicates a connection with an uncommon gens, the Hispo. Ronald Syme provides a list of the handful of known names with this element, noting that Pliny the Younger's second wife's aunt was named Calpurnia Hispulla. Both Rufus and Hispulla had one known daughter, Corellia Hispulla, who was also part of Pliny's circle of acquaintances; she was the first wife of Lucius Neratius Marcellus, suffect consul in 95 and ordinary consul in 129, by whom she had a son, Lucius Corellius Neratius Pansa, ordinary consul in 122.

Political offices
Preceded by Decimus Junius Novius Priscus, and Lucius Ceionius Commodus as Ordinary consuls	Suffect Consul of the Roman Republic; 78 with Lucius Funisulanus Vettonianus	Succeeded by Sextus Vitulasius Nepos, and ignotus as Suffect consuls
