= Gaius Eggius Ambibulus =

Roman senator and consul for 126

Gaius Eggius Ambibulus was a Roman senator active in the second century AD. He was ordinary consul for 126 as the colleague of Marcus Annius Verus; Lucius Valerius Propinquus replaced Verus by 1 March and was his colleague for the remainder of the first nundinium of that year. Ambibulus is known only through inscriptions.

An inscription from Aeclanum, a town of Campania, which the decurions of that town erected to honor Ambibulus as their patron, preserves his full name, an example of polyonymy: Gaius Eggius Ambibulus Pomponius Longinus Cassianus Lucius Maecius Postumus. The third element in his name, "Ambibulus", is a cognomen Ronald Syme describes as "peculiar and uncommon"; he could only count five examples of its use in inscriptions found at Rome, and one more in North Africa. Obviously the fourth and fifth elements in his name come from his mother. Edmund Groag suggested that the last three elements in his name may be due to a testamentary adoption by the suffect consul of the year 98, Lucius Maecius Postumus. In his study of the politics following the death of Domitian, John D. Grainger describes Postumus as one of "the usual aristocratic drones". The origins of "Cassianus" in Ambibulus' name are unknown.

Ambibulus' origins are in Aeclanum. Two tombstones erected by Ambibulus provide details of his mother's family. One honors his mother's brother, Marcus Pomponius Bassulus Longinianus; the other honors his maternal grandfather, Marcus Pomponius Bassulus, and includes a somber funeral poem. From these inscriptions we can infer his mother's name was Pomponia Longina, and his father's also Eggius Ambibulus. An inscription from Pisidian Antioch offers the name Eggia C.f. Ambibula, the wife of Publius Calvisius Ruso Julius Frontinus, governor of Cappadocia; she might be Ambibulus' sister or cousin.

== Career ==
The inscription the decurions of Aeclanum erected provides details of his cursus honorum about as far as his consulate. He began as one of the decemviri stlitibus judicandis, one of the four boards of the vigintiviri; membership in one of these four boards was a preliminary and required first step toward gaining entry into the Roman Senate. Serving as one of these minor magistracies was considered an important first step in a senator's career. Next Ambibulus was commissioned as a military tribune of Legio XI Claudia, which was stationed at several points on the Danubian frontier during the possible dates Ambibulus was assigned to this legion. The inscription records he was sevir equitum Romanorum of the annual review of the equites at Rome, then he was adlected inter patricios—into the patrician order. The reason for Ambibulus' admission to this highest stratum of Roman society is unknown, but it is only the first instance of favor shown to him by the emperor Trajan.

Ambibulus was appointed quaestor to the emperor Trajan; to hold this magistracy in connection with the emperor was a very prestigious honor. After serving as legatus or assistant to the governor of Macedonia, as a patrician Ambibulus was excused from the next Republican magistracy and was the emperor's candidate for praetor. At this point he gained acceptance into two Roman priesthoods, the salii Collini and flamines Claudiales, before acceding to the consulate.

His life after the consulate is a blank. Since Ambibulus had such a promising career to that point, it is tempting to suggest he may have died within a few years of stepping down from his last known office.

Political offices
| Preceded by Marcus Herennnius Faustus, and Quintus Pomponius Marcellus as Suffect consuls | Consul of the Roman Empire; AD 126 with Marcus Annius Verus, followed by Lucius Valerius Propinquus | Succeeded by Lucius Cuspius Camerinus, and Gaius Saenius Severus as Suffect consuls |
