= Lucius Plautius Lamia Silvanus =

2nd century Roman senator and consul

Lucius Plautius Lamia Silvanus (c. 110 – aft. 145) was a Roman senator.

== Life ==
He was suffect consul for the nundinium of March-April 145 with Lucius Poblicola Priscus as his colleague.

Silvanus was the son of Lucius Fundanius Lamia Aelianus and his wife Rupilia. According to the Historia Augusta, Silvanus married Aurelia Fadilla (died 135), daughter of Antoninus Pius and Faustina the Elder. The marriage is generally accepted as real, though probably childless.

Also according to the Historia Augusta, the wife of Gordian I was a Roman woman called Fabia Orestilla, born circa 165, whom the Historia Augusta claims was a descendant of emperors Antoninus Pius and Marcus Aurelius through her father Fulvus Antoninus. Modern historians have dismissed this name and her information as false. His wife died before 238. Christian Settipani tentatively identified her parents as Marcus Annius Severus, who was a suffect consul, and his wife Silvana, born circa 140, who he argues was the daughter of Silvanus and Fadilla.

Political offices
Preceded by Antoninus Pius IV, and Marcus Aurelius II as ordinary consuls	Suffect consul of the Roman Empire; 145 with Lucius Poblicola Priscus	Succeeded by Gnaeus Arrius Cornelius Proculus, and Decius Junius Paetus as suffect consuls
