= Arria (philosopher) =

2nd century Roman philosopher

Arria was a philosopher and Platonist of the 2nd century CE. We know that she was a friend of the medical annalist Galen, and was admired by Roman emperors Septimius Severus and Caracalla.

Scholar Gilles Ménage, in his Historia Mulierum Philosopharum, proposed that it was to this Arria that Diogenes Laërtius dedicated his Lives and Opinions of Eminent Philosophers.

== See also ==
- Arria gens
