= Acutia gens =

Ancient Roman family

The gens Acutia was a minor plebeian family at Ancient Rome. Members of this gens are mentioned from the early Republic to imperial times. The first of the Acutii to achieve prominence was Marcus Acutius, tribune of the plebs in 401 BC.

== Origin ==
The nomen Acutius is derived from the Latin adjective acutus, sharp or intelligent.

== Praenomina ==
The main praenomina of the Acutii were Marcus, Lucius, Quintus, and Gaius, four of the most common names throughout Roman history. A number of other praenomina received occasional use, of which only Publius appears regularly. Salvius, an Oscan praenomen, occurs once. Rufus, which also occurs, may have been a cognomen rather than a praenomen, although it was occasionally used as a praenomen in Cisalpine Gaul; or it may have been a servile name.

== Branches and cognomina ==
The earliest Acutii are found without a cognomen. Nerva, the surname of Quintus Acutius, consul in AD 100, is derived from nervus, sinewy.

== Members ==
This list includes abbreviated praenomina. For an explanation of this practice, see filiation.

- Marcus Acutius, tribune of the plebs in 401 BC, was co-opted by his colleagues, in violation of the lex Trebonia.
- Lucius Acutius L. l. Dasius, a freedman buried at Fundi in Latium, in the latter part of the first century BC, or the first half of the first century AD.
- Publius Acutius P. l. Pamphilus, a freedman named in an inscription from Suasa in Umbria, dating to the Augustan era.
- Quintus Acutius Faienanus, governor of Lusitania, probably shortly after the establishment of the province, between 19 and 1 BC.
- Gaius Acutius C. f., buried at Corona in Venetia and Histria, together with his wife, Turpilia Tertia, in the first half of the first century AD.
- Acutia, the wife of Publius Vitellius, whose nephew Aulus Vitellius became emperor in AD 69.
- Lucius Acutius L. f. Rufus, a magistrate at Pompeii in Campania.
- Tiberius Acutius Ti. l. Adauctus, a freedman, was a soldier stationed at Pompeii between AD 60 and 79.
- Tiberius Acutius Barbula, a soldier stationed at Pompeii between AD 60 and 79.
- Tiberius Acutius Paterculus, a soldier stationed at Pompeii between AD 60 and 79.
- Tiberius Acutius Ti. f. Spendon, a freeborn native of the region, was a soldier stationed at Pompeii between AD 60 and 79.
- Quintus Acutius Nerva, consul suffectus in AD 100.
- Lucius Acutius L. f. Primus, an eques, and one of the duumviri jure dicundo at Brixia in Venetia and Histria, some time between the accession of Trajan and AD 150.
- Marcus Acutius Valentinus, the husband of Rasinia Lucifera, and father of Marcus Acutius Valentinus, a boy buried at Rome toward the end of the first century, or the beginning of the second.
- Lucius Acutius Marcellus, client of Gaius Saenius Verus, an eques and one of the duumviri jure dicundo for Laurentum, according to an inscription from Altinum in Venetia and Histria, dating to the late first century, or the early second.
- Marcus Acutius M. f. Valentinus, the son of Marcus Acutius Valentinus and Rasinia Lucifera, buried at Rome toward the end of the first century, or the beginning of the second, aged eleven years, one month, and eighteen days.
- Marcus Acutius Justus, named in an inscription from Lambaesis, dating to AD 98.
- Marcus Acutius M. l. Eutychus, a freedman named in an inscription from Rome, dating to AD 106.
- Gaius Acutius, named in an inscription from Philae in Egypt, dating to AD 116.
- Acutia Q. f. Sabina, buried at Augusta Bagiennorum in Liguria, in a tomb built by Quintus Vequasius Fortunatus, dating to the first half of the second century.
- Marcus Acutius, made an offering to Jupiter Optimus Maximus at Carnuntum in Pannonia Superior, some time in the second century.
- Acutia Prepusa, named in an inscription from Industria in Liguria, dating to the second century.
- Acutia Charis, built a tomb at Rome for her slave, Sergia Chreste, aged six, some time in the second or early third century.
- Lucius Acutius Trypho, the son of Artemidorus, was a rhetorician, named in an inscription from Pisaurum in Umbria, dating to the second century.
- Marcus Acutius Ingenuus, a scout named in an inscription from Lambaesis, dating to AD 186.
- Acutius Quintinus, a veteran named in an inscription from Apulum in Dacia, dating to AD 191.
- Publius Acutius Lucretianus, dedicated a second or third century monument at Aquileia in Venetia and Histria to his son, Publius Acutius Martialis, a veteran soldier.
- Acutia Ursula, built a tomb at Tridentum in Venetia and Histria for her husband, Marcus Aurelius Sextinius, one of the Seviri Augustales, dating to the second or third century.
- Publius Acutius P. f. Martialis, a veteran soldier buried at Aquileia, toward the end of the second century or in the first half of the third, with a monument from his father, Publius Acutius Lucretianus.
- Acutia Restituta, buried at Rome, aged twenty-five, in a tomb dedicated by her husband, Julius Hypnus, and dating to the second half of the second century, or the first half of the third.
- Acutia Matrona, the wife of Gaius Longinius Severinus, and mother of Longinius Avitus, buried in a family sepulchre at Emona in Pannonia Superior, toward the end of the second century, or in the first half of the third.
- Acutia Ursa, together with Acutius Ursus, in AD 220 made an offering to the gods at Mogontiacum in Germania Superior.
- Acutius Ursus, together with Acutia Ursa, in AD 220 made an offering to the gods at Mogontiacum.
- Marcus Acutius Hilarus, a soldier in the century of Aelius Torquatus, in the fifth cohort of the vigiles at Rome, at the beginning of the third century.
- Acutius Fortunatus, a soldier named in an inscription from Tunes in Africa Proconsularis, dating to AD 230.

=== Undated Acutii ===
- Acutia, daughter of Ant[...], buried at Rome, aged thirteen.
- Acutius, buried at Rome, aged thirty.
- Acutia, buried her husband, Felix, at Rome, on the eighth day before the ides of November, or November 6.
- Acutia, the wife of Aulus Venusius, and mother of Aulus Venusius Constans, one of the duumviri jure dicundo at Clusium.
- Acutius, named in an inscription from Carthage in Africa Proconsularis.
- Acutius, named in an inscription from Virunum in Noricum.
- Aulus Acutius, one of the Seviri Augustales, buried at Nesactium in Venetia and Histria.
- Gaius Acutius C. f., named in an inscription from Praeneste in Latium.
- Lucius Acutius, named in an inscription from Praeneste.
- Marcus Acutius C. f., named in an inscription from Praeneste.
- Quintus Acutius, the husband of Acutia Primigenia, and father of Quintus Acutius Fortis, a little boy buried at Rome.
- Quintus Acutius, the lover of Agatia, named in an inscription found near Mutina in Cisalpine Gaul.
- Quintus Acutius, an officer in an uncertain legion, named in an inscription from the present site of Brohl, formerly part of Germania Superior.
- Rufus Acutius, the son of Comincilio?, named in a libationary inscription from Brixia.
- Salvius Acutius L. f., named in an inscription from Augusta Taurinorum in Cisalpine Gaul, together with his wife, Quinta Magilia.
- Acutius [...]ianus, a centurion in the third legion, buried at Lambaesis in Numidia.
- Acutia Accepta, buried in a family sepulchre built at Brixia by her husband, Marcus Suricius Epagathus, one of the Seviri Augustales.
- Marcus Acutius P. f. Acutianus, an eques buried at Cluana in Picenum, aged thirty years, six months, and twenty-five days, with a monument from his wife, Laecania Martina.
- Marcus Acutius Aegipas, probably a freedman, named in an inscription from Puteoli in Campania, together with his wife, Sicilia Agathe.
- Acutius Agathemerus, named in a funerary inscription from Rome.
- Quintus Acutius Q. l. Agilio, a freedman named in a funerary inscription from Ateste in Venetia and Histria.
- Acutia Allage, buried at Ateste.
- Acutia Amatrix, buried at Lugdunum in Gallia Lugdunensis, in a tomb built by her husband, Gaius Cantius Fluentinus.
- Sextus Acutius Aquila, praetor in an uncertain year, built a monument at Aquae Sextiae in Gallia Narbonensis to his father, Acutius, mother, Ingenua, sister, Severa, and brother, Rufus.
- Acutius Aristo, one of the sons of Acutius [...]ianus, a centurion in the third legion, buried at Lambaesis.
- Acutia Athenais, buried at Ateste.
- Acutia Auga, freedwoman of Lucius Titurius Sura, for whom she built a tomb at Ateste.
- Acutius Basileus, buried at Puteoli, aged twenty-two years, six months, and thirteen days, with a monument from his father, Cassius Theon.
- Acutia L. l. Blanda, a freedwoman named in an inscription from Altinum.
- Lucius Acutius Caecilianus, dedicated a monument at Brixia to his foster-mother, Caecilia Procula.
- Acutia Caesia, built a tomb near Brixia for her husband M[...] Aper.
- Acutia Capitolina, named in an inscription from Hispania Citerior.
- Acutia Chloë, buried at Rome.
- Lucius Acutius Clemens, made a libationary offering to Mercury at Brixia.
- Quintus Acutius Q. l. Diomedes, a freedman, and one of the Seviri Augustales at Altinum.
- Quintus Acutius Epagathus, together with Sestia Primitiva, built a tomb for his good friend, and Sestia's husband, Gaius Lepidius Narcissianus.
- Acutia C. l. Eloge, a freedwoman who made an offering to Juno at Brixia.
- Acutia Emerita, buried at Lambaesis, aged three, together with her mother, Amullia Africana, aged twenty-seven, in a tomb built by her grandfather, Gaius Amullius Africus.
- Acutia Epiteuxis, built a tomb at Nemausus in Gallia Narbonensis for her husband, Titus Geminius Titianus, prefect of the vigiles.
- Acutia Fa[...], buried at Mutina.
- Marcus Acutius Faustinus, a veteran of the praetorian guard, buried at Blera in Etruria, aged fifty-six, having served twenty-three years, with a monument from Gnaeus Epulanius Pius.
- Lucius Acutius Felix, built a tomb at Rome for his wife, Caecilia Petale, and her slave, Lucius Caecilius Aprilis.
- Acutia Flaccinilla, buried at Lambaesis, in a sepulchre built by her husband, Publius Aelius Processus, an eques, and flamen.
- Quintus Acutius Q. f. Fortis, the son of Quintus Acutius and Acutia Primigenia, buried at Rome, aged three years, five months.
- Quintus Acutius Hermes, buried at Nemausus, with a monument from his patron, Quintus Atilius Acutius.
- Acutia Irene, a freedwoman buried at Rome, with a tomb dedicated by Quintus Acutius Trypho.
- Publius Acutius Italicus, a little boy buried at Ilipa in Hispania Baetica, aged six years and nine months.
- Gaius Acutius L. f. Julius, buried at Brixia.
- Acutia Justina, buried at Neapolis, in a tomb built by her husband.
- Lucius Acutius Leo, dedicated a tomb at Misenum in Campania to his wife, Popaedia Quarta.
- Quintus Acutius Leucon, together with Julia Eunia, built a tomb at Rome for Julia's son, Gaius Julius Mercurius, aged fifteen years, six months, and sixteen days.
- Acutia Liberalis, made a libationary offering to Diana at Novae in Moesia Superior.
- Acutia Ɔ. l. Lyris, a freedwoman buried at Ateste, with a monument from her husband, Clemens.
- Marcus Acutius M. f. Marcellus, named in an inscription from Ateste, together with Marcus Acutius Secundus.
- Acutia Marina, buried at Gades in Hispania Baetica, aged forty-one.
- Gaius Acutius C. f. Maturus, made a libationary offering at Patavium in Venetia and Histria.
- Acutia M. f. Maxima, buried at Mantua in Venetia and Histria.
- Marcus Acutius M. l. Noetus, a freedman named in a testamentary inscription from Concordia Sagittaria in Venetia and Histria.
- Quintus Acutius Sp. f. Optatus, named in an inscription from Mutina.
- Acutius Porcianus, one of the sons of Acutius [...]ianus, a centurion in the third legion, buried at Lambaesis.
- Acutia Primigenia, the wife of Quintus Acutius, and mother of Quintus Acutius Fortis, a little boy buried at Rome.
- Acutia Proculina, daughter of Proculinus, buried at Clunia in Hispania Citerior.
- Acutia Protogenia, built a tomb at Cemenelum in Alpes Maritimae for her daughter, Valeria Materna, and grandson, Julius Albiccianus.
- Lucius Acutius L. l. Quadratus, a freedman named in an inscription from Altinum.
- Gaius Acutius Romanus, dedicated a monument at Rome to his brother, Gaius Acutius Severus.
- Quintus Acutius Rufio, named in an inscription from Ateste.
- Marcus Acutius Salutaris, built a tomb at Rome for himself and his wife, Turullia.
- Acutius Saturninus, buried at Garriana in Africa Proconsularis, aged eighty-five.
- Lucius Acutius Secundus, named in a testamentary inscription from Constantia in Alpes Poeninae.
- Marcus Acutius M. f. Secundus, named in an inscription from Ateste, together with Marcus Acutius Marcellus.
- Lucius Acutius Sextus, named in two inscriptions from Vasio in Gallia Narbonensis.
- Acutia Severilla, buried at Altinum.
- Lucius Acutius Severinus, buried at Nemausus in a family sepulchre built by his wife, Ventidia Nice, along with their son, Lucius Acutius Ventidius.
- Gaius Acutius Severus, quartermaster of the seventh legion, buried at Rome with a monument from his brother, Gaius Acutius Romanus.
- Gaius Acutius Speratus, buried at the present site of Stommeln, formerly part of Germania Inferior, together with Petronia Justina.
- Acutius Strabo, one of the sons of Acutius [...]ianus, a centurion in the third legion, buried at Lambaesis.
- Acutia Successa, buried at Pstia, in a tomb built by her husband, Gaius Marius Felix.
- Titus Acutius Tacitus, dedicated a monument at Rome for his wife, Castricia Valeria.
- Quintus Acutius Trypho, built a tomb at Rome for Acutia Irene.
- Acutia Tyche, the daughter of Julia Arche, buried at Rome, aged twenty-eight.
- Acutia Ursa, buried in the family sepulchre built at Brixia by her husband, Valerius Primitius.
- Gaius Acutius Valens, dedicated a monument at Rome to his brother, the eques Marcus Aurelius Verus Vettianus.
- Lucius Acutius L. f. Ventidius, the son of Lucius Acutius Severinus and Ventidia Nice, buried in the family sepulchre built by his mother.

== See also ==
- List of Roman gentes

== Bibliography ==
- Titus Livius (Livy), History of Rome.
- Gaius Plinius Caecilius Secundus (Pliny the Younger), Epistulae (Letters).
- Publius Cornelius Tacitus, Annales.
- Dictionary of Greek and Roman Biography and Mythology, William Smith, ed., Little, Brown and Company, Boston (1849).
- Theodor Mommsen et alii, Corpus Inscriptionum Latinarum (The Body of Latin Inscriptions, abbreviated CIL), Berlin-Brandenburgische Akademie der Wissenschaften (1853–present).
- Giovanni Battista de Rossi, Inscriptiones Christianae Urbis Romanae Septimo Saeculo Antiquiores (Christian Inscriptions from Rome of the First Seven Centuries, abbreviated ICUR), Vatican Library, Rome (1857–1861, 1888).
- Notizie degli Scavi di Antichità (News of Excavations from Antiquity, abbreviated NSA), Accademia dei Lincei (1876–present).
- Ettore Pais, Corporis Inscriptionum Latinarum Supplementa Italica (Italian Supplement to the Corpus Inscriptionum Latinarum), Rome (1884).
- Supplementa Italica (Supplement for Italy), Unione Accademica Nazionale.
- Bulletin Archéologique du Comité des Travaux Historiques et Scientifiques (Archaeological Bulletin of the Committee on Historic and Scientific Works, abbreviated BCTH), Imprimerie Nationale, Paris (1885–1973).
- René Cagnat et alii, L'Année épigraphique (The Year in Epigraphy, abbreviated AE), Presses Universitaires de France (1888–present).
- George Davis Chase, "The Origin of Roman Praenomina", in Harvard Studies in Classical Philology, vol. VIII, pp. 103–184 (1897).
- Inscriptiones Italiae (Inscriptions from Italy), Rome (1931–present).
- Géza Alföldy, Fasti Hispanienses, Steiner, Wiesbaden (1969).
- Bulletin Archéologique de Provence (Archaeological Bulletin of Provence, abbreviated BAP), Avignon, (1978–present).
- Julián González Fernández, "La Vega (Hispalis)", in Corpus de Inscripciones Latinas de Andalucia, Seville (1991).
- John C. Traupman, The New College Latin & English Dictionary, Bantam Books, New York (1995).
