= Lucius Valerius Propinquus =

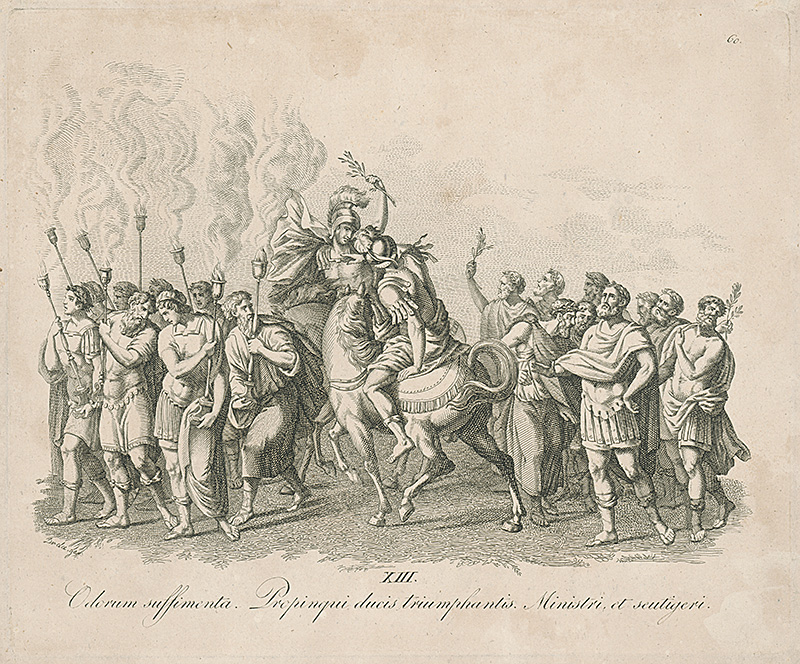
Triumph of Lucius Valerius Propinquus, engraved by Josef Jan Alois Drda, Prague, round 1822

Lucius Valerius Propinquus was a Roman senator active in the second century AD. He was suffect consul who replaced the ordinary consul Marcus Annius Verus and was the colleague of the other ordinary consul, Gaius Eggius Ambibulus, for the remainder of the first nundinium of 126.

His full name was reconstructed by Géza Alföldy from a fragmentary inscription found in Tarraco, Spain, and is thought to be Lucius Valerius Pomponius Granius Grattius [? Cerealis] Geminius Restitutus. Ronald Syme identified his place of origin as Liria in Tarraconensis.

== Career ==
Due to the state of the Spanish inscription, only a few of the offices Propinquus held are known for certain. The earliest that can be identified is legatus legionis or commander of Legio VI Victrix, around 120; Anthony Birley is uncertain whether Propinquus held his commission before or after the legion's transfer to Roman Britain in 122, or whether he was the predecessor or successor of Publius Tullius Varro, consul in 127, also known to have commanded the legion around that period.

The inscription indicates he was next governor of a province, but all of the name is lost except for the initial letter "A". While Arabia Petraea is a possibility, Birley believes a more likely candidate is Gallia Aquitania (usually referred to in Roman inscriptions as simply "Aquitania"). Werner Eck agrees with Birley, and dates his tenure as 123/124 to 124/125. Propinquus held no further offices until after his consulship, when he was appointed cura alvei Tiberius; also following his consulate, Propinquus was co-opted into the quindecimviri sacris faciundis, one of the major priesthoods of ancient Rome. This was followed by Propinquus being appointed governor of the imperial province of Germania Inferior 130/131 to 132 and 133. His career was successfully completed when the sortition selected him proconsular governor of Asia, one of the most desired proconsular offices to hold; Propinquus was governor in 140/141.

Political offices
Preceded by Marcus Annius Verus III, and Gaius Eggius Ambibulus as ordinary consuls	Suffect consul of the Roman Empire; AD 126 with Gaius Eggius Ambibulus	Succeeded by Lucius Cuspius Camerinus, and Gaius Saenius Severus as suffect consuls
