= Lucius Funisulanus Vettonianus =

Roman general and senator

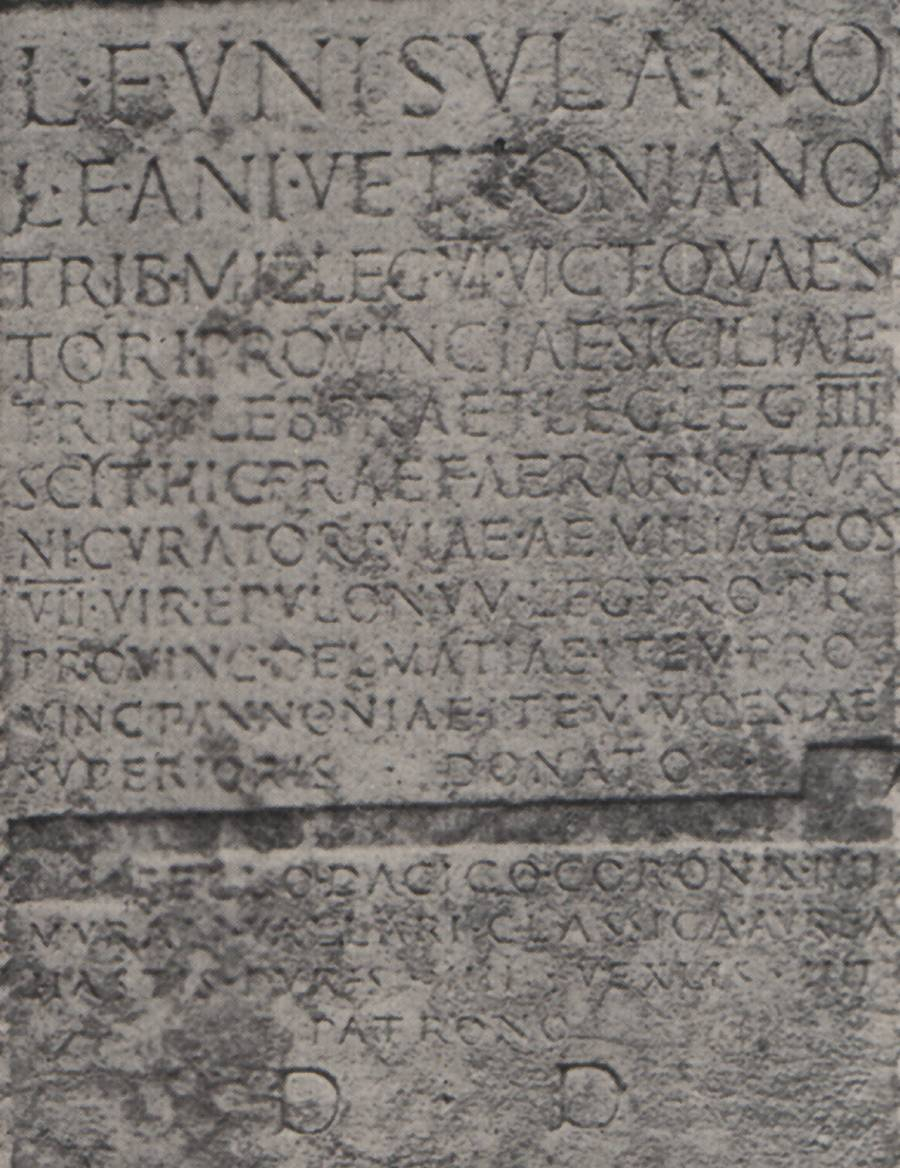
- The inscription CIL III, 4013 with his cursus honorum

ordinary consul

Lucius Funisulanus Vettonianus was a Roman general and senator during the reigns of the Flavian emperors. He was suffect consul in the nundinium of September to October 78 with Quintus Corellius Rufus as his colleague.

== Life ==
Vettonianus had an inauspicious start to his career, as a tresviri capitales, one of the magistracies that comprised the vigintiviri. This was the least desirable office of the four, for men who held that office rarely had a successful career: Anthony Birley could find only five tresviri capitales who went on to be governors of consular imperial provinces. Following this he was commissioned as a military tribune of the Legio VI Victrix, then stationed at the city of Legio (modern-day León) in Hispania Tarraconensis. After serving as a quaestor in Sicily, he accepted another commission as the legatus legionis or commander of the Legio IV Scythica in AD 62, stationed at Zeugma in Syria. At one point Vettonianus found himself commanding the legion under the leadership of Lucius Caesennius Paetus in the Roman–Parthian War of 58–63. The legion, however, was defeated in the Battle of Rhandeia and suffered dishonor.

The next posts Vettonianus held were civilian ones: prefect of the aerarium Saturni (or the treasury), curator of the Via Aemilia, and curator aquarum (or manager of the water supply). These were obviously all held after Nero's death, proving he was rehabilitated by Vespasian of the dishonor from Rhandeia. The prefecture of the aerarium Saturni could be precisely dated to between about 74 and about 76, but the date of the rest pose a problem. While the prefecture could be held by an ex-praetor, and thus before Vettonianus was suffect consul, the curatorship of the roads was more often held after the consulate, and that of the water supply always was; but the inscription grouped them together, as if Vettonianus held them before acceding to the consulate. It may be that as similar positions, it made sense to group them together in the inscription, or Vettonianus was adjunct curator aquarum to the man usually considered his predecessor, Manius Acilius Aviola.

After his nundinium as suffect consul, Vettonianus was appointed governor of Dalmatia in 79, and held the post through 84, the first of several imperial provinces he held without interruption. Next was governor of Pannonia in 85/86, then from a point before 5 September 85 he governed Moesia Superior until 88. While governor of Moesia Superior, Vettonianus participated in the Dacian Wars with such valor he was awarded the dona militaria appropriate for an ex-consul.

Vettonianus capped his career with the proconsulate of Africa in 91–92. He was also appointed to a priesthood in the sodales Augustales, but was later promoted to the septemviri epulonum before his death.

Vettonianus' tomb was erected on the Via Latina. His possible descendants include Titus Pomponius Antistianus Funisulanus Vettonianus, suffect consul in the year 121, and Funisulana Vettulla, the wife of Gaius Tettius Africanus Cassianus Priscus, prefect of Egypt.

Political offices
Preceded by Decimus Junius Novius Priscus, and Lucius Ceionius Commodus as Ordinary consuls	Suffect Consul of the Roman Republic; 78 with Quintus Corellius Rufus	Succeeded by Sextus Vitulasius Nepos, and ignotus as Suffect consuls
