= Quintus Arrius (praetor 73 BC) =

Quintus Arrius (c. 112–71 BC) was a Roman praetor in 73 BC. In the next year he should follow Gaius Verres as governor of Sicilia. But first he had to support the consuls Lucius Gellius Publicola and Gnaeus Cornelius Lentulus Clodianus in the Third Servile War against the leaders of the rebellious slaves, Spartacus and Crixus. In the battle in which Arrius conquered Crixus 20,000 slaves are said to have been killed; but Arrius was soon after defeated by Spartacus. A scholiast on Cicero said that Quintus Arrius was later sent to Sicily to take over this province from Verres, but died on the way there. However, the scholiast does not seem to be well informed, and the veracity of his assertion is doubtful. It only can be said that Quintus Arrius did not govern Sicilia.

He had a son, also named Quintus Arrius.

== Bibliography ==
- Elimar Klebs: Arrius 7, in: Realencyclopädie der classischen Altertumswissenschaft, vol. II,1 (1895), c. 1252
