= Gnaeus Arrius Augur =

Roman consul 121 AD

Gnaeus Arrius Augur was a Roman politician and senator in the second century AD.

== Biography ==
Gnaeus Arrius Augur was born between 79 and 90 AD. He was a member of gens Arria, his family hailing from Gallia Narbonensis. His grandfather was Gnaeus Arrius Antoninus, consul of 97 AD, grandfather also of the Emperor Antoninus Pius, thus making them first cousins once removed.

Arrius Augur started the cursus honorum during the reign of Trajan, continuing into the reign of Hadrian, when he was elected consul in 121 AD together with Marcus Annius Verus as his colleague.
