= Quintus Arrius Q. f. =

Ancient Roman politician

Quintus Arrius Q. f. was an ancient Roman of high birth in the 1st century BCE. We know little of him today beyond a smattering of information about his failed political career and the ire of his friends at his behavior.

He was the son of the praetor Quintus Arrius, and was an unsuccessful candidate for the Roman consulship in 59 BCE. He was also an intimate, longtime friend of the writer Cicero However, during his exile Cicero would later write several letters to friends and family bitterly complaining about the conduct of his friend, whom he generally describes as having betrayed him in his hour of need.
