= Conza della Campania =

Conza della Campania Cònze (Neapolitan)
- Comune
- Comune di Conza della Campania
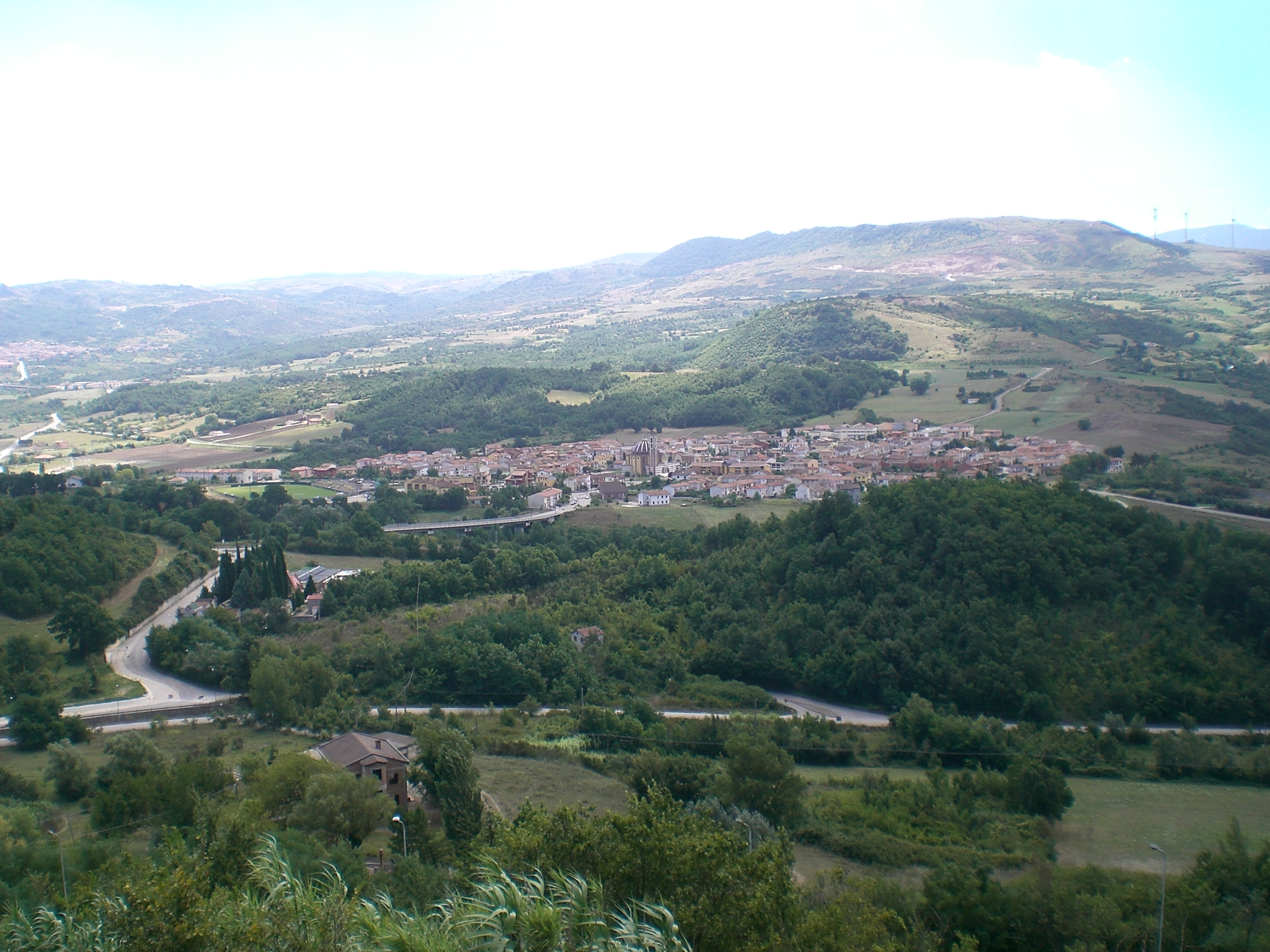
- The new settlement, built after the 1980 earthquake.

- Location within Italy Location within Campania
- Coordinates: 40°52′N 15°20′E
- Country: Italy
- Region: Campania
- Province: Avellino (AV)

Government
  - Mayor: Raffaele Cantarella

Area
  - Total: 51.64 km^{2} (19.94 sq mi)
- Elevation: 440 m (1,440 ft)

Population (30 June 2017)
  - Total: 1,345
  - Density: 26.05/km^{2} (67.46/sq mi)
- Demonym: Conzani
- Time zone: UTC+1 (CET)
  - Summer (DST): UTC+2 (CEST)
- Postal code: 83040
- Dialing code: 0827
- ISTAT code: 064030
- Website: Official website

Conza della Campania or Conza di Campania, commonly known as Conza (Campanian: Cònze; ancient name: Compsa) is a comune (municipality) and former Latin Catholic (arch)bishopric in the province of Avellino in the region of Campania in southern Italy.

== History ==
=== Early history ===
Compsa was an ancient city of the Hirpini occupied by the Carthaginian conqueror Hannibal in 216 BC.

=== Medieval and modern history ===
During the Early Middle Ages, it was a gastaldate in the Principality of Salerno. In 973, the gastald (city-based Lombard royal domain district administrator and judge) Landulf seized the principality. Later, it belonged to the Balvano, the Gesualdo, and the Mirelli families.

=== Recent history ===
The town was almost completely destroyed by the 1980 Irpinia earthquake. It was rebuilt in the area called Piano delle Briglie, 8 km (5 mi) from the former center. Conza della Campania is now a turistic attraction, since it can count among its territory the WWF Oasi, including the lake of Conza and the area outside. Conza della Campania has also about 10,000 visitors a year at its Archeological site, Compsa, discovered after the earthquake of 1980 that destroyed the old town.

== Main sights ==
The main church is the Concattedrale (co-cathedral) of S. Maria Assunta. Other sights include the archaeological area of Compsa and the natural oasis of Lake Conza, an artificial basin on the Ofanto river.

== See also ==
- List of Catholic dioceses in Italy
