= Venetia et Histria =

Subdivision of Roman Italy

Regio X — Venetia et Histria
- Region of Roman Italy
- 7 AD–292 AD
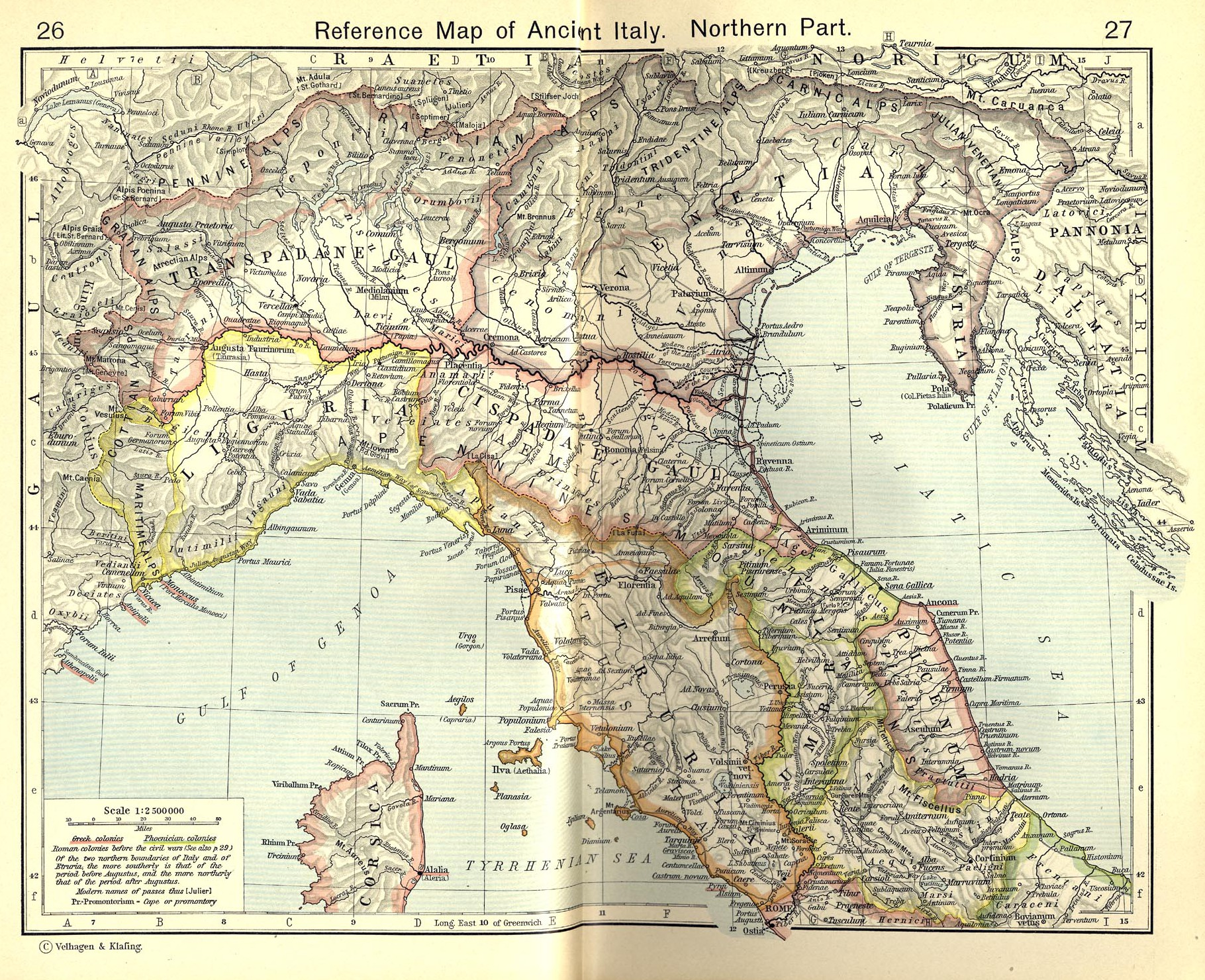
- Capital: Aquileia
- Historical era: Antiquity
  - Created by Augustus: 7 AD
  - Renamed in Diocletian's administrative reforms: 292 AD
Preceded by	Succeeded by
Cisalpine Gaul	Venetia et Histria (province)
- Today part of: Italy; Croatia; Slovenia

Venetia et Histria (Latin: Regio X Venetia et Histria) was an administrative subdivision in the northeast of Roman Italy. It was originally created by Augustus as the tenth regio in 7 AD alongside the nine other regiones. The region had been one of the last regions of Italy to be incorporated into the Roman Empire. It was later renamed by Diocletian the VIII provincia Venetia et Histria in the third century. Its capital was at Aquileia, and it stretched geographically from the Arsia River in the east in what is now Croatia to the Abdua in the current Italian region of Lombardy and from the Alps to the Adriatic Sea.

== Etymology ==
The name Venetia et Histria was used for the region in part because of the "early and unwavering" loyalty of the local Veneti people to the Roman state. This name was also preferred to using the name of a more rebellious group like the Celtic Cenomani because of the Roman belief in a shared descent with the Veneti from the Trojans. The second term refers to the Istria peninsula and the ancient people of that region.

== History ==
Pliny the Elder was the only Roman writer to discuss the Augustan subdivision of Italy into regiones directly and did so in his Natural History. The region's new borders did not cleave directly to pre-existing regional identities. Verona which had traditionally been seen as part of Transpadana as it was north of the Po was not incorporated into the region with that name, regio XI but was made part of regio X.

Neratius Pansa, a Roman senator of the late first century AD, is believed, on the basis of epigraphic evidence, to have led a census here under the reign of the Emperor Vespasian in 73–74.

== Geography ==
Modern map of regio X

We now come to the tenth region of Italy, situated on the Adriatic Sea. In this district are Venetia, the river Silis, rising in the Tarvisanian mountains, the town of Altinum, the river Liquentia rising in the mountains of Opitergium, and a port with the same name, the colony of Concordia; the rivers and harbours of Romatinum, the greater and lesser Tiliaventum, the Anaxum, into which the Varamus flows, the Alsa, and the Natiso with the Turrus, which flow past the colony of Aquileia at a distance of fifteen miles from the sea. This is the country of the Carni, and adjoining to it is that of the lapydes, the river Timavus, the fortress of Pucinum, famous for its wines, the Gulf of Tergeste, and the colony of that name, thirty-three miles from Aquileia.

— Pliny the Elder, Natural History, Perseus Project Nat.3.22

In the late first century AD, Pliny identified 36 cities in the region, while Strabo identified 12 in the same area. The CIL has identified 16 separate settlements using epigraphic evidence, and other historians have argued that "the density of cities for the region is not high compared to the rest of Italy".

While the capital of the region, Aquileia, was a major centre for commerce, transport, and public life in northeastern Italy, with an amphitheater that could hold more than 27,000 and a position at the centre of a wide network of roads, other cities like Concordia, Tergeste, and Altinum were also substantial regional hubs.

== Gallery ==
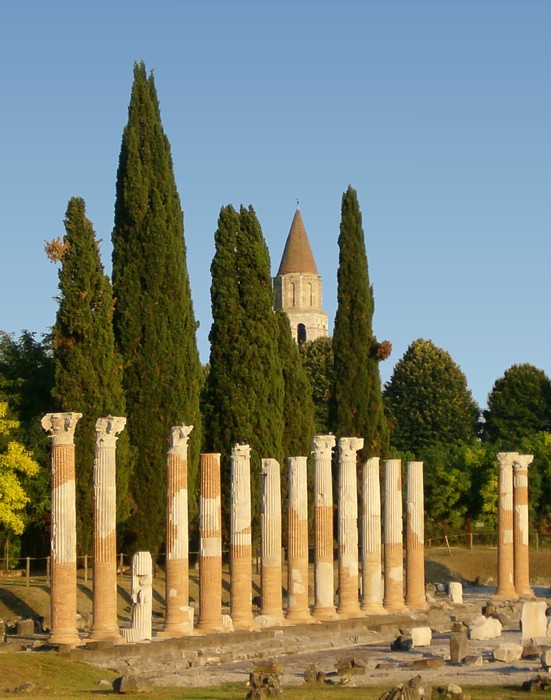
Columns in Aquileia

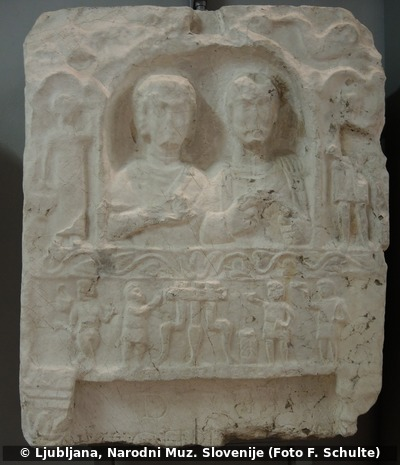
Inscription from Emona

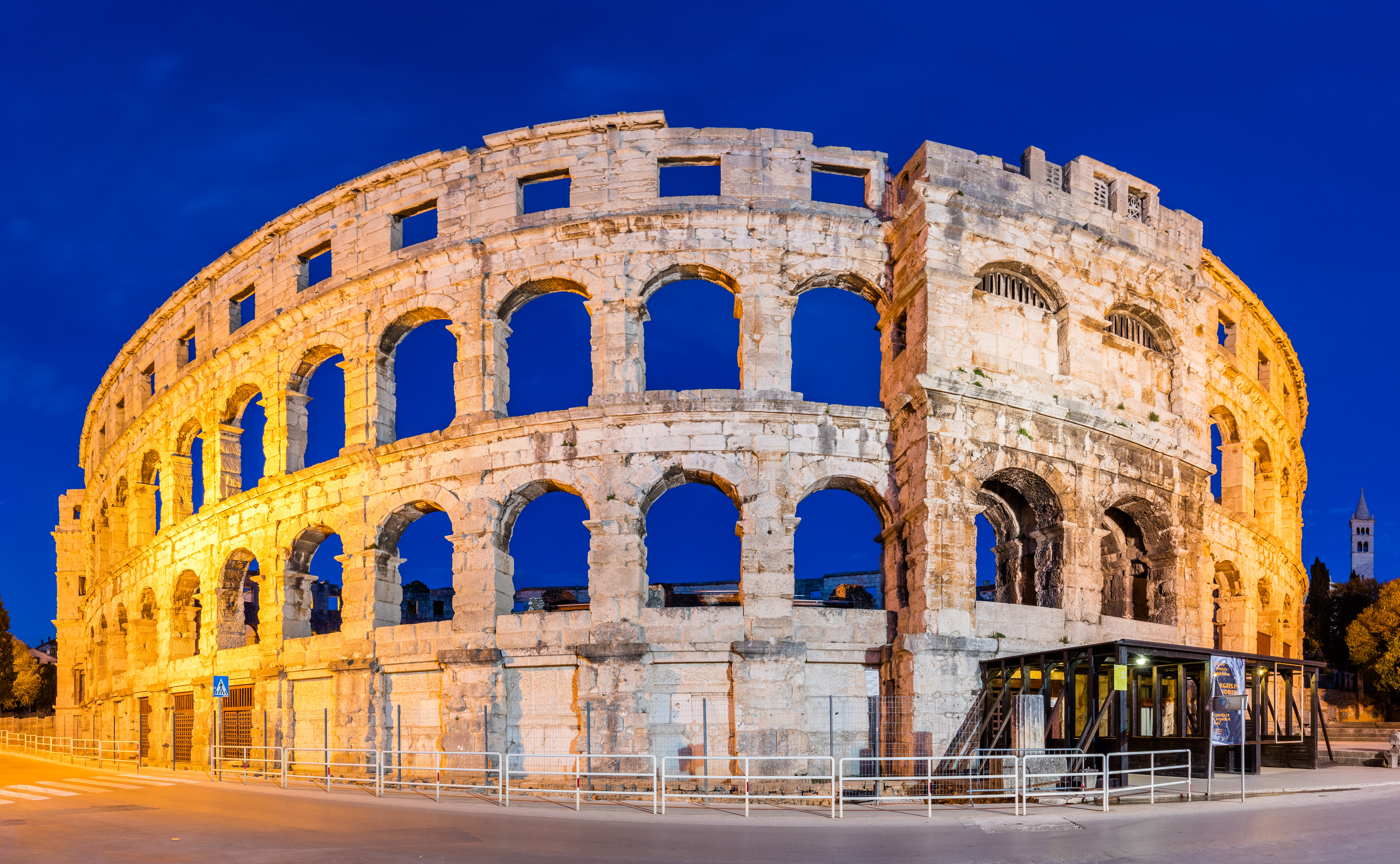
Amphitheatre in Pula

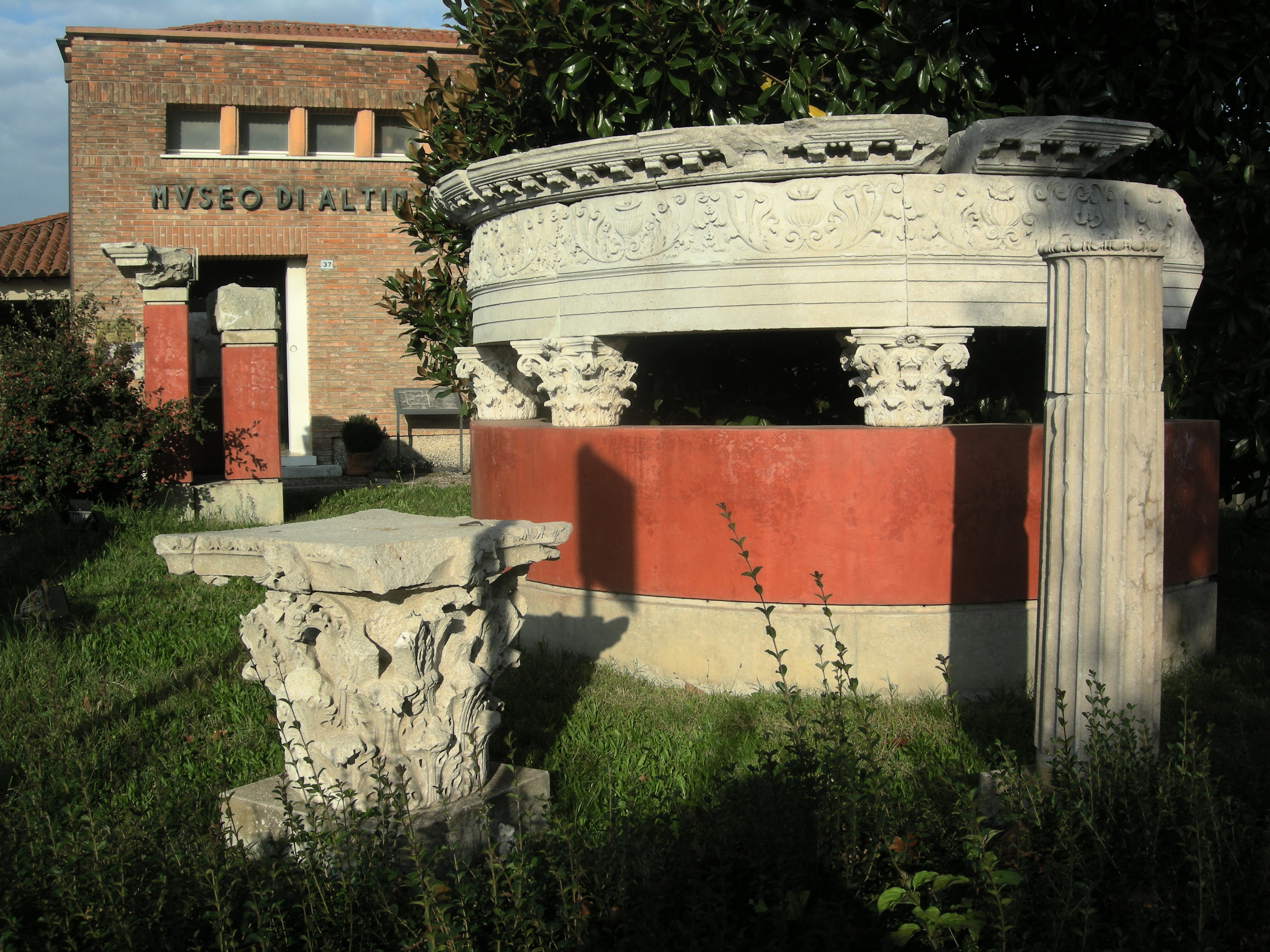
Ruins at museum in Altinum

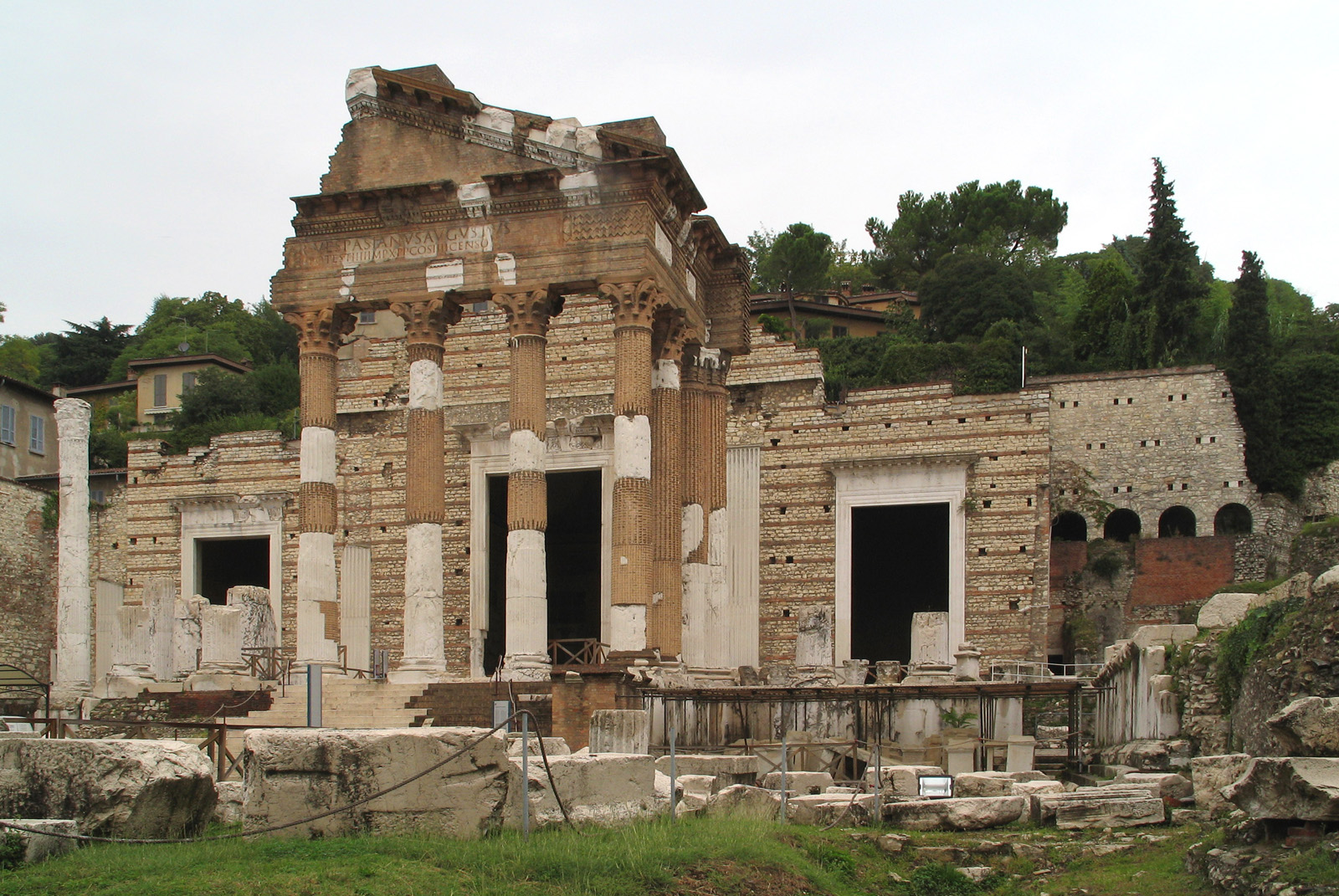
Temple at Brescia
