= Lycia et Pamphylia =

Roman province located in modern-day Turkey

Coordinates: 36.2603°N 29.3142°E

Province of Lycia and Pamphylia Provincia Lycia et Pamphylia (Latin) ἐπαρχία Λυκίας καὶ Παμφυλίας (Koine Greek)
- Province of the Roman Empire
- 74–325
- Capital: Attalia (modern-day Antalya, Turkey)
- Historical era: Antiquity
  - Established: 74
  - Disestablished: 325
- Today part of: Turkey

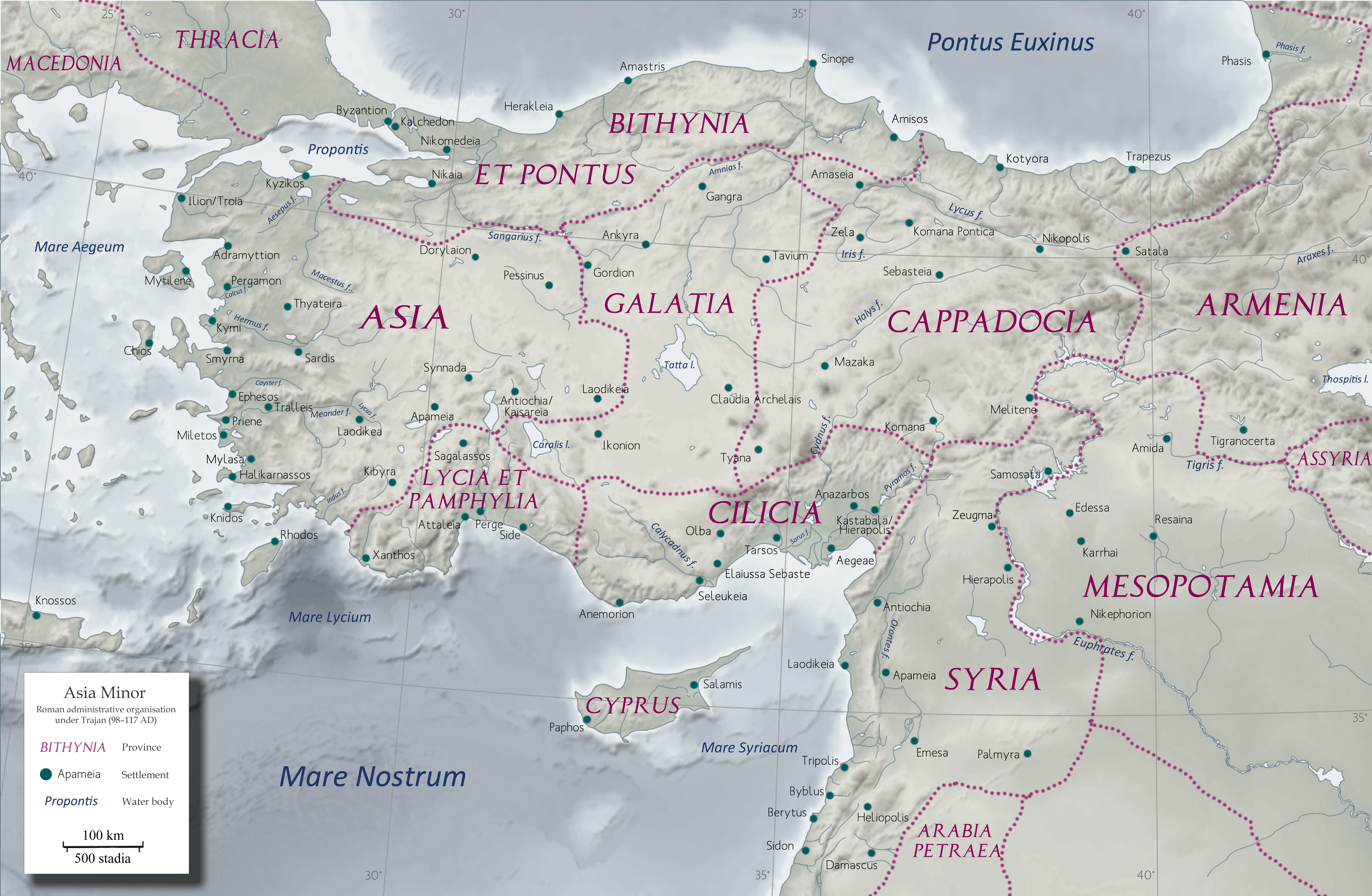
The Roman provinces of Asia Minor under Trajan, including Lycia et Pamphylia.

The Roman Empire under Hadrian (ruled 117–38), showing the senatorial province of Lycia et Pamphylia in southern Anatolia

Lycia and Pamphylia (Latin: Lycia et Pamphylia; Koine Greek: Λυκία καὶ Παμφυλία, romanized: Lykía kaì Pamphylía) was the name of a province of the Roman Empire, located in southern Anatolia. It was created by the emperor Vespasian (r. 69–79), who merged Lycia and Pamphylia into a single administrative unit. In 43 AD, the emperor Claudius had annexed Lycia. Pamphylia had been a part of the province of Galatia.

The borders drawn by Vespasian ran west of the River Indus (which flowed from its upper valley in Caria) from the Pisidian plateau up to Lake Ascanius (Burdur Gölü), to the south of Apamea. In the north and east it formed a line which followed the shores of the lakes Limna (Hoyran Gölü) and Caralis (Beyşehir Gölü), turned south towards the Gulf of Adalla (mare Pamphylium) and followed the Taurus Mountains (Toros Dağları) for some ten miles towards east up to Isauria. It then followed Cilicia Trachea to reach the sea to the west of Iotape. The borders were drawn taking into account geographical and economic factors. The whole of the basins of the rivers Xanthus, Cestrus (Ak Su) and Eurymedon (Köprü Irmak) were included. The main cities were at the mouth of the latter two rivers. In Pisidia and in Pamphylia they were in part followed by the few roads into the interior of Anatolia. The most important one was the road from Attalea (Antalya) to Apamea. In Lycia the road from Patara towards Laodicea on the Lycus followed the coast. Important cities were Side, Ptolemais, Gagae and Myra on the coast, Seleucia, inland and Cremna, Colbhasa and Comama, on the Pisidian Plateau, where Augustus had founded Roman colonies (settlements). On the Milyas plateau there were Oenoanda, Tlos, Nisa, Podalia, Termessus, and Trebenna. Other important cities in Lycia include Pednelissus, Ariassus, and Sagalassus; along the Eurymedon, Aspendus and Perge, which had a sanctuary of Artemis. The most important city in the region was Patara, at the mouth of the Xanthus.

Under the administrative reforms of emperor Diocletian (reigned AD 284–305), who doubled the number of Roman provinces by reducing their size, Lycia et Pamphylia was split into two separate provinces. The provinces were grouped into twelve dioceses which were under the four Praetorian prefectures of the empire. Lycia and Pamphylia were under of Diocese of Asia (Dioecesis Asiana), of the Praetorian Prefecture of Oriens (the East).

== Governors ==
(List based on Rémy Bernard, Les carrières sénatoriales dans les provinces romaines d'Anatolie au Haut-Empire (31 av. J.-C. - 284 ap. J.-C.) (Istanbul: Institut Français d'Études Anatoliennes-Georges Dumézil, 1989), pp. 279-329)

=== Imperial legates ===
- Quintus Veranius (AD 43–48)
- M. Calpurnius Rufus (48-53)
- Titus Clodius Eprius Marcellus (53-56)
- Gaius Licinius Mucianus (c. 60)
- Sextus Marcius Priscus (67-70)
- Marcus Hirrius Fronto Neratius Pansa (70-72)
- Gnaeus Avidius Celer Fiscillinus Firmus (72-74)
- Lucius Luscius Ocrea (74-76)
- Marcus Petronius Umbrinus (76-78)
- Titus Aurelius Quietus (78-81)
- Gaius Caristanius Fronto (81-84)
- Publius Baebius Italicus (84-87)
- Gaius Antius Aulus Iulius Quadratus (c. 90–93)
- Lucius Domitius Apollinaris (c. 93–96)
- Lucius Julius Marinus Caecilius Simplex (96-99)
- Gaius Trebonius Proculus Mettius Modestus (99-103)
- Quintus Pompeius Falco (103-105)
- Lucius Julius Frugi (113-115)
- Gaius Trebius Maximus (115-117)
- Titus Pomponius Antistianus Funisulanus Vettonianus (117-119 or 120)
- Gaius Valerius Severus (120-122 or 121–123)
- Marcus Flavius Aper (c. 125–128)
- Publius Sufenas Verus (128?-131?)
- ?Mettius Modestus (130-133)
- [Domiti]us Seneca (133-135 or 136)
- Titus Calestrius Tiro Julius Maternus (135 or 136–138)
- Gnaeus Arrius Cornelius Proculus (138-140)
- Julius Aqui[linus] (140-142)
- Decimus Junius Paetus (?142-?144)
- Quintus Voconius Saxa Fidus (?143-147)
- Gaius Julius Avitus (?147-?149)
- Decimus Rupilius Severus (149-151)
- Julius Proculus (attested September 152)
- Gaius Septimius Severus (c. 154 and 159)

=== Senatorial praetorian proconsuls ===
- Publius Vigellius Saturninus (c. 162–164)
- Sal[...] (between 162 and 167)
- Decimus Fonteius Fronto (?164/165)
- Julius Modestus (165/166)
- Tiberius Julius Frugi (c. 167/168)
- Licinius Priscus (attested 23 March 178)
- Gaius Julius Saturninus (?178/179)
- M.? Claudius Cassius Apronianus (c. 180/181–182/183)
- Marcus Gavius Crispus Numisius Junior (182–184)
- Marcus Umbrius Primus (c. 185)
- Gaius Pomponius Bassus Terentianus (186?/187?)
- Lucius Annius Annianus (c. 187/188–195/196)
- Titus Flavius Carminius Athenagoras Claudianus (c. 188–189)
- Sulpicius Justus Dryantianus (between 197/198)
- Gnaeus Pompeius Hermippus Aelianus (between 180 and 212)
- Tiberius Claudius Vibianus Tertullus (180–200)
- Julius Tarius Titianus (c. 202–205)
- Gaius Porcius Priscus Longinus (reign of Caracalla?)
- Titus Flavius Philinus (c. 225–230)
- Quintus Ranius Terentius Honoratianus Festus (reign of Alexander Severus)
- Tiberius Pollenius Armenius Peregrinus (242/243)
- [...] Julianus Sura Magnus (c. 245)
- Ae(lius)? Pollio (249-251)
- Publius Julius Aemilius Aquila (between 253 and 276)

=== Equestrian procurators ===
- Terentius Marcianus (reign of Probus)
- Flavius Areianus Alypius (reign of Probus)
