= Compsa =

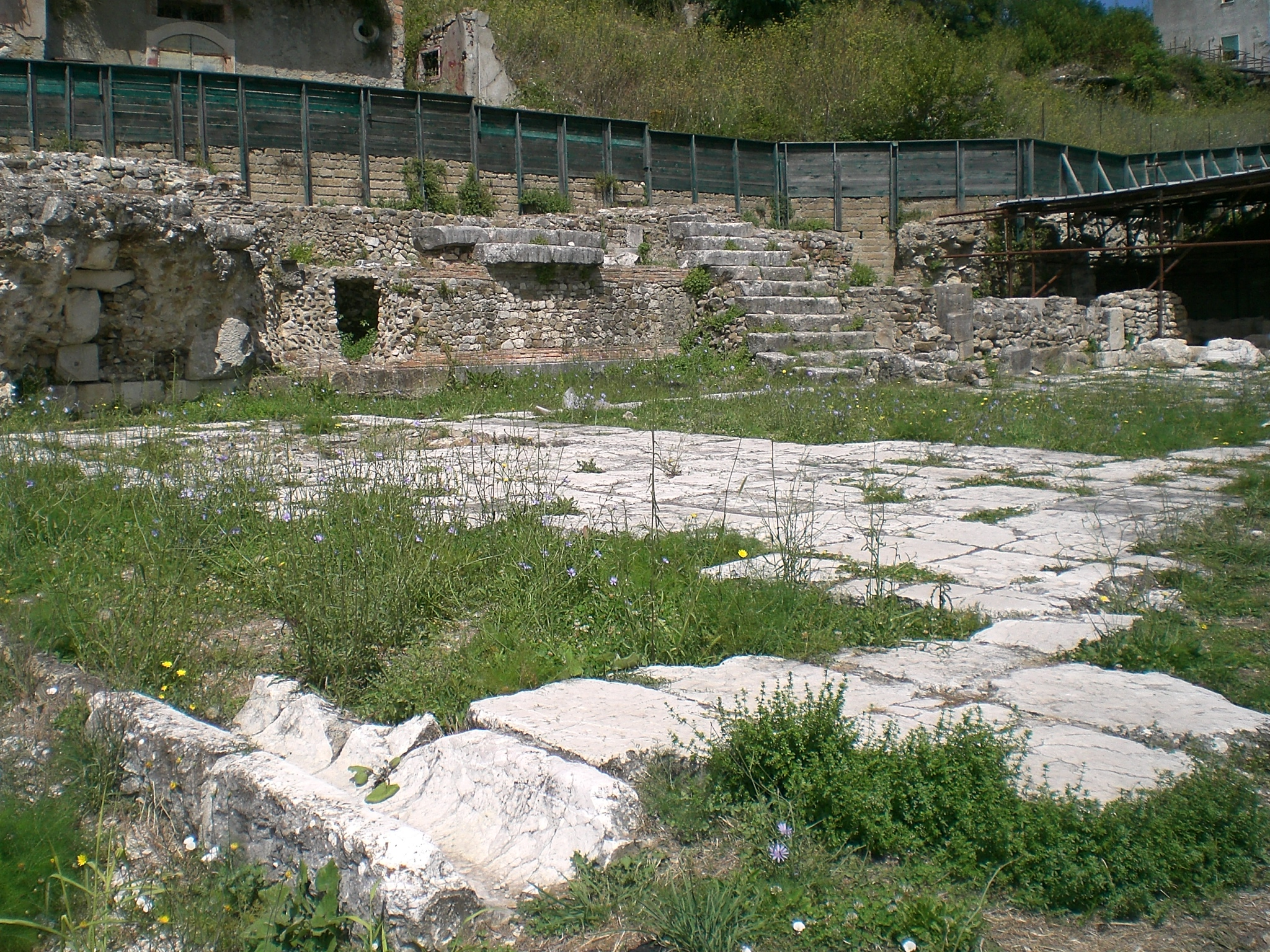

- Location within Campania
- 40°52′13″N 15°19′50″E
- Type: Settlement
- Location: Conza della Campania, Province of Avellino, Italy
- Region: Campania

Site notes
- Management: Soprintendenza per i Beni Archeologici di Salerno, Avellino, Benevento e Caserta
- Public access: Yes
- Website: Sito Archeologico di Compsa (in Italian)

Compsa (modern Conza della Campania) was an ancient city of the Hirpini, near the sources of the Aufidus, on the boundary of Lucania and not far from that of Apulia, on a ridge 609 m above sea level. It was betrayed to Hannibal in 216 BC after the defeat of Cannae, but recaptured two years later. It was probably occupied by Sulla in 89 BC, and was the scene of the death of Titus Annius Milo in 48 BC.

Most modern sources, for example Hülsen in Pauly-Wissowa's Realencyclopädie (Stuttgart, 1901, iv. 797), refer Caesar's Commentarii de Bello Civili (iii. 22) and Pliny's Naturalis Historiæ to this place, supposing the ancient manuscripts to be corrupt. Thus the usual identification of the site of Milo's death with Cassano allo Ionio on the Gulf of Taranto must be incorrect.

In imperial times, as inscriptions show, it was a municipium, but it lay far from any of the main highways. The ruins of the ancient city were studied again, when they reappeared after the destruction of the modern town in the 1980 Irpinia earthquake.
