= Lollia Saturnina =

Roman noblewoman and sister of empress Lollia Paulina (c. AD 10–41)

Lollia Saturnina (c.10-41) was a Roman noble woman who lived in the Roman Empire in the 1st century. She was the sister of the Roman empress Lollia Paulina and was a mistress of the Roman emperor Caligula.

== Family background and early life ==
Saturnina was a member of the plebeian gens Lollia. Saturnina was the first daughter of Marcus Lollius by Volusia Saturnina, while her younger sister was Lollia Paulina.

Her father, Marcus Lollius was the son born to the consul and military officer Marcus Lollius by his wife Valeria. Valeria was one of the daughters of the literary patron and consul Marcus Valerius Messalla Corvinus and a sister to the Roman Senators Marcus Valerius Messalla Messallinus and Marcus Aurelius Cotta Maximus Messalinus. Publius Lollius Maximus may have been her paternal uncle, or he was a close relation to his paternal grandfather. Her cognomen Saturnina, she inherited from the paternal ancestry of her mother's family.

Her mother Volusia Saturnina, came from an ancient and distinguished Senatorial family, Tacitus states never rose above the Praetorship. She was the daughter of Nonia Polla and Lucius Volusius Saturninus who was the son of the prefect, Quintus Volusius and his wife Claudia. Claudia was a daughter of Pompey's officer Tiberius Claudius Nero and a sister of praetor, Tiberius Claudius Nero, as Volusia Saturnina was a first cousin once removed to Roman emperor Tiberius and his brother, the General Nero Claudius Drusus. The brother of Volusia Saturnina was the consul Lucius Volusius Saturninus. Saturnina was born and raised in Rome. She was a beautiful woman, who was one of the heirs of the wealth of her grandfather, Marcus Lollius.

== Marriage and Caligula ==
Saturnina married Decimus Valerius Asiaticus, who served as a suffect consul in 35 and was a wealthy, prominent Roman Senator. Asiaticus was of Allobrogian origin from Gallia Narbonensis and was the first Roman Senator from that place. Saturnina with Asiaticus had a son called Decimus Valerius Asiaticus. There is a possibility they may have other children.

Around 39, six months after Caligula divorced her sister Lollia Paulina, Saturnina became a mistress to Caligula. Caligula discussed their relationship in the presence of her husband Asiaticus, which caused Asiaticus to hate Caligula. Asiaticus later became a suspect of Caligula's assassination.

The freedman Marcus Lollius Philippus, who loaned large sums of money to various members of the gens Sulpicii, may have been one of the freedmen of Saturnina.

== Inscriptional evidence ==
Below is the only Latin inscription which directly mentions Saturnina; it also mentions one freedman Marcus Lollius Princeps and two freedwomen Lollia Urbana and Lollia Methe.

D(is) m(anibus) s(anctum)|M(arco) Lollio Saturninae l(iberto)|Principi amico fidissimo|
qui vixit annis LVIII et|Lollia Saturninae l(ibertae)|Urbanae contubernal(i) eius [et]|
Lolliae Saturninae lib(ertae)|Methes sorori eius Lollia|C(aii) l(iberta) Galatea paren-
tib(us) carislsmis fecit permissu Urlsionis contuberanal(is) mei (CIL VI 21473a).

== Sources ==
- Seneca the Younger, De Constantia sapientis
- Tacitus, The Annals of Imperial Rome
- Horace - Edited by O.A.W Dilke, Horace: Epistles Book I, Taylor & Francis
- G. Highet, The Classical Tradition: Greek and Roman Influences on Western Literature, Oxford University Press, 1949
- G. Rickman, Roman Granaries and Store Buildings, CUP Archive, 1971
- T.P. Wiseman, Talking to Virgil: A Miscellany, University of Exeter Press, 1992
- S.J. Harrison, Homage to Horace: A Bimillenary Celebration, Oxford University Press, 1995
- The Roman World: Gallia Narbonensis's Urbs of Vienna
- A bit of History – Lollia Saturnina
- Lollius by D.C. O’Driscoll
- Genealogy of Volusius Saturninus by D.C. O’Driscoll
- Marcus Lollius’ article at Livius.org
- Romeins Imperium – Lucius Quintus Volusius Saturninus translated from Dutch to English
- Romeins Imperium – Lollia Paulina translated from Dutch to English
- Bernard J. Kavanagh, "Lollia Saturnina", Zeitschrift für Papyrologie und Epigraphik, 136 (2001), pp. 229-232
