= Saturnina (disambiguation) =

Saturnina was a Christian virgin martyr, now considered to be purely legendary.

Saturnina may also refer to:

- Lollia Saturnina, 1st century Roman noblewoman, a mistress of Emperor Caligula
- Volusia Saturnina (fl. 1st century BC–1st century AD), ancient Roman noblewoman, mother of Lollia Saturnina
- Saturnina Hidalgo (1850–1913), sister of Philippine national hero José Rizal
- Saturnina Rodríguez de Zavalía (1823–1896), Argentine Roman Catholic beatified nun, founder of the order of the Handmaids of the Heart of Jesus
