= Decimus Valerius Taurus Catullus Messallinus Asiaticus =

2nd century Roman member of the Arval Brethren

Decimus Valerius Taurus Catullus Messallinus Asiaticus was a member of the Arval Brethren who lived in the second half of 1st century and first half of 2nd century.

== Family background ==
Asiaticus was of Allobrogian and Roman ancestry. He was the son of the wealthy, prominent and powerful Roman Senator figure Marcus Lollius Paulinus Decimus Valerius Asiaticus Saturninus and the noblewoman Valeria Catulla Messallina, who came from a family of consular rank. The parents of his father were the Legatus, Decimus Valerius Asiaticus and his wife, Vitellia, the daughter of the Roman emperor Vitellius by his wife Galeria Fundana. His name reveals that he was related to the consul of the mid-1st century Titus Statilius Taurus Corvinus; was a descendant of the Gallic consul, Roman Senator Decimus Valerius Asiaticus by his wife, Lollia Saturnina and it is presumed he is the last known descendant of the brother of the poet Gaius Valerius Catullus. He was born and raised in Rome.

== Career ==
In 105, during the reign of Roman emperor Trajan he served as a member of the Arval Brethren. According to inscriptional evidence, Asiaticus was honored on the Greek island of Samos and in the ancient Greek city of Ephesus.

When Asiaticus died, he was honored with two funeral Greek inscriptions in Ephesus. The honorary inscriptions celebrate him as being the son of Marcus Lollius Paulinus Decimus Valerius Asiaticus Saturninus and his career being a priest serving in Rome.

υίωνῷ Δ[έκμου έκγό]-
νῳ, Ούλ[τινία Ταύρῳ Κατύλ]-
λῳ Μεσσα[λίνῳ Άσιατικᾢ, Ούα]-
λερίου Άσια[τικοῦ υίᾢ]

[Ταύρῳ Κ]ατύλλῳ Μεσσαλίνῳ Άσια]-
[τικῲ, Ούα]λερίο[υ Άσιατικοῦ]
[υίῷ πο]ντίφικ[ος Σαλίου
[Κολλεί]νου, έπάρ[χου Ῥώμης,]
[τρίων άν]δρων [χαλκοῦ]
[άργύρου] χρυσο[ῦ χαρακτη]-
[ριάσαντ]ος, τ[αμία Ῥώμης - ]

== Sources ==
- Flavius Josephus, Death of an Emperor, University of Exeter Press, 1991
- A.K. Bowman, E. Champlin & A. Lintott, The Cambridge Ancient History, Volume 10, Cambridge University Press, 1996
- G. Morgan, 69 AD: The Year of Four Emperors, Oxford University Press, 2005
- M.B. Skinner, A Companion to Catullus (Google eBook), John Wiley & Sons, 2010
- Marcus Lollius Paullinus Valerius Asiaticus Saturninus & Valerii Catulli at Romeins Imperium, translated from Dutch to English
- Greek inscription from Ephesus
- Greek inscription from Ephesus
