= Gabinia gens =

Ancient Roman family

The gens Gabinia was a plebeian family at ancient Rome. Members of this gens first appear in the second century BC. The nomen derives from the city of Gabii, east of Rome.

== Praenomina ==
All of the Gabinii known from historical records bore the praenomina Aulus, Publius, and possibly Gaius.

== Branches and cognomina ==
The Gabinii do not seem to have been divided into distinct stirpes. The surnames Capito, Cimber, and Sisenna are associated with individual members.

== Members ==
This list includes abbreviated praenomina. For an explanation of this practice, see filiation.

- (Aulus?) Gabinius, placed in command of the garrison at Scodra in Illyricum by the proconsul Lucius Anicius Gallus in 167 BC.
- Aulus Gabinius, tribune of the plebs in 139 BC, he introduced the first lex tabellaria, permitting voting by ballot.
- Aulus Gabinius, quaestor in 101 BC, serving under the proconsul Marcus Antonius against the Cilician pirates.
- Aulus (or Gaius?) Gabinius, a legate in the Social War, who campaigned successfully against the Marsi and Lucani; he was killed while blockading an enemy camp, BC 89.
- Aulus Gabinius, a military tribune who fought under Sulla at the Battle of Chaeronea. In BC 81, Sulla sent him to Asia with instructions for Lucius Licinius Murena to end the war with Mithridates of Pontus. He was known for his moderation and sense of honour.
- Aulus Gabinius, consul in 58 BC. As tribune of the plebs in 66, he had introduced the law giving Pompeius command in the war against the pirates. As proconsul of Syria, he intervened in an Egyptian dynastic struggle, for which he was later prosecuted, fined, and exiled, although he was later recalled by Caesar.
- Aulus Gabinius A. f. Sisenna, son of the consul, he begged Memmius to stop haranguing his father before the people, but to no avail.
- Publius Gabinius Capito, praetor in 89 BC, he was subsequently propraetor in Achaea. On his return to Rome he was accused of extortion by Lucius Calpurnius Piso, (Note: It is not immediately apparent which of the Calpurnii corresponds with this Piso.) and condemned. In 76 BC he was one of three envoys sent to Erythrae in order to collect Sibylline prophecies.
- Publius Gabinius Capito, or Gaius Gabinius Cimber, an active member of the conspiracy of Catiline in 63 BC.
- Aulus Gabinius Secundus, consul in AD 35.
- Aulus Gabinius Secundus, consul in AD 43.
- Publius Gabinius Secundus Chaucius (or Cauchius), a general under Claudius.
- Gaius Gabinius Barbarus Pompeianus, proconsul of Asia between 212 and 217.
- (Gabinius) Barbarus Pompeianus, consularis of Campania in 333 AD.
- Gabinius, a king of the Germanic Quadi, murdered by Valentinian I circa AD 374.
- Gabinius Barbarus Pompeianus, governor of Africa circa AD 400, and praefectus urbi of Rome during Alaric's siege in 409. He proposed making sacrifices to the pagan gods to protect the city, and was lynched by a mob during a food shortage.

== See also ==
- List of Roman gentes

== Bibliography ==
- Titus Livius (Livy), Ab Urbe Condita (History of Rome).
- Marcus Tullius Cicero, De Legibus, Divinatio in Quintum Caecilium, In Catilinam, Laelius de Amicitia, Pro Archia Poeta, Pro Lege Manilia.
- Gaius Sallustius Crispus (Sallust), Bellum Catilinae (The Conspiracy of Catiline).
- Appianus Alexandrinus (Appian), Bella Mithridatica (The Mithridatic Wars).
- Valerius Maximus, Factorum ac Dictorum Memorabilium (Memorable Facts and Sayings).
- Plutarchus, Lives of the Noble Greeks and Romans.
- Lucius Cassius Dio Cocceianus (Cassius Dio), Roman History.
- Florus, Epitome de T. Livio Bellorum Omnium Annorum DCC.
- Paulus Orosius, Historiarum Adversum Paganos (History against the Pagans).
- Dictionary of Greek and Roman Biography and Mythology, William Smith, ed., Little, Brown, and Company, Boston (1849).
- Dictionary of Greek and Roman Antiquities, William Smith, ed., Little, Brown, and Company, Boston (1859).
- T. Robert S. Broughton, The Magistrates of the Roman Republic, American Philological Association (1952–1986).
