= Marcus Lollius Paullinus Decimus Valerius Asiaticus Saturninus =

Late 1st/early 2nd century Roman senator, governor and prefect

Consul of the Roman Empire
- In office 94
- Emperor: Domitian
- In office 125
- Emperor: Hadrian

Personal details
- Born: c. 69/70
- Died: After 134
- Citizenship: Roman
- Spouse: Valeria Catulla Messallina
- Children: Decimus Valerius Taurus Catullus Messallinus Asiaticus
- Parent: Decimus Valerius Asiaticus
- Occupation: Politician

Marcus Lollius Paullinus Decimus Valerius Asiaticus Saturninus (69/70 – after 134) was a prominent Roman Senator who was a powerful figure in the second half of the 1st century and first half of the 2nd century. He is also known by the shorter form of his name, Decimus Valerius Asiaticus, the same name carried by his father and grandfather.

== Family background and early life ==
Saturninus was of Allobrogian and Roman ancestry. He was the son of Decimus Valerius Asiaticus and Vitellia the daughter of the emperor Vitellius from his wife Galeria Fundana. His father served as a Legatus of Gallia Belgica, and later became the governor of that province in the reign of the emperor Nero. The father of Saturninus became powerful through wealth and the skilful exploitation of imperial patronage.

The family of his father were originally from Vienna, Gallia Narbonensis. Saturninus was the grandson of the consul Decimus Valerius Asiaticus and his wife Lollia Saturnina, whose younger sister Lollia Paulina was the third wife of the emperor Caligula. Saturninus was a grandson of Decimus Valerius Asiaticus and Lollia Saturnina. The name of Saturninus reveals paternally he is related to the Valeria, and Lollia gentes.

Despite the presence of Lollii Paulini on his father's side, Olli Salomies argues that "surely the collocation of his names points to the conclusion that they are due to a (testamentary) adoption; the adopting parent may, of course, well have been a relative of the grandmother, since ... adoptive sons and fathers were in fact often closely related."

When Vespasian became emperor in second half of 69, Asiaticus was designated consul in 70; however, he died early that year before he could enter his consulship. Asiaticus was survived by Vitellia and their son. Later in 70, Vespasian arranged for Vitellia to remarry another unnamed man. Her second marriage was a splendid match for her and Vespasian provided for her, the dowry and clothing. Although he was born in Vienna, Saturninus was raised in Rome; otherwise little is known about his early life.

== Political career ==
An inscription from Tivoli provides details for the earlier part of his cursus honorum. Saturninus started his career in the reign of the emperor Domitian, as one of the tresviri monetalis, the most prestigious of the four boards that comprise the vigintiviri; assignment to this board was usually allocated to patricians or individuals favored by the emperor. The next honors listed on the inscription are membership in the Salii Collinus and election as one of the Pontiffs, which apparently happened when he was in his twenties. Then at the age of 25, he held the post of quaestor, being selected as one of the pair allocated to attend to the emperor; the duties of these quaestors included reading the Emperor's speeches to the Senate. The inscription breaks off where it mentions his appointment as praetor, which usually happened at the age of 30.

We can supply details of the later part of his career from other sources. One attests to Saturninus serving as a suffect consul for the nundinium of May-August 94. Another reports that Saturninus was proconsular governor of Asia for the term 108/109. Werner Eck reports an unpublished inscription from Africa indicates he was governor of Hispania Tarraconensis at some point during the reign of Hadrian. From the years 124 to 134, he served as a Praefectus urbi in Rome. In 125, he held the fasces again, this time as consul ordinarius. During his political career in the first half of the second century, he was friends with the emperors Trajan and Hadrian.

== Marriage and issue ==
Saturninus married Valeria Catulla Messallina who came from a family of consular rank. Messallina bore Asiaticus a son called Decimus Valerius Taurus Catullus Messallinus Asiaticus.

== Sources ==
- Epilogue: The Fall of the Vitellii - Vitellia?, daughter
- Prosopographia Imperii Romani, L 320
- E.M. Wightman, Gallia Belgica, University of California Press, 1985
- Flavius Josephus, Death of an Emperor, University of Exeter Press, 1991
- A.K. Bowman, E. Champlin & A. Lintott, The Cambridge Ancient History, Volume 10, Cambridge University Press, 1996
- Biographischer Index der Antike (Google eBook), Walter de Gruyter, 2001
- B. Jones, The Emperor Domitian (Google eBook), Routledge, 2002
- Gwynn Morgan, 69 AD: The Year of Four Emperors, Oxford University Press, 2005
- M.B. Skinner, A Companion to Catullus (Google eBook), John Wiley & Sons, 2010
- A. Freisenbruch, The First Ladies of Rome: The Women Behind the Caesars (Google eBook), Random House, 2011

Political offices
Preceded by Lucius Nonius Calpurnius Torquatus Asprenas, and Titus Sextius Magius Lateranus as ordinary consuls	Suffect consul of the Roman Empire; 94 with Gaius Antius Aulus Julius Quadratus	Succeeded by Lucius Silius Decianus, and Titus Pomponius Bassus as suffect consuls
Preceded by Gaius Julius Gallus, and Gaius Valerius Severus as suffect consuls	Consul of the Roman Empire; 125 with Lucius Titius Epidius Aquilinus	Succeeded by Quintus Vetina Verus, and Publius Lucius Cosconianus as suffect consuls
