= Asiaticus =

Asiaticus may refer to:

- Lucius Cornelius Scipio Asiaticus (2nd century BC), a Roman general and statesman
- Lucius Cornelius Scipio Asiaticus (consul 83 BC)
- Antiochus XIII Asiaticus (died 64 BC), a Seleucid ruler
- Decimus Valerius Asiaticus (died 47), an Imperial Roman consul
- Decimus Valerius Asiaticus (flourished 1st century), an Imperial Roman senator
- Decimus Valerius Taurus Catullus Messallinus Asiaticus (flourished 1st century & 2nd century), a Roman Priest and grandson of the above named

== See also ==
- List of Latin and Greek words commonly used in systematic names#Asiatica
