= T. asiaticus =

T. asiaticus may refer to:

- Teilhardina asiaticus, a prehistoric mammal species in the genus Teilhardina
- Tibellus asiaticus, a spider species in the genus Tibellus
- Trollius asiaticus, a plant species
- Typhlodromips asiaticus, a mite species in the genus Typhlodromis

== See also ==
- Asiaticus (disambiguation)
