= E. asiaticus =

E. asiaticus may refer to:

- Ephippiorhynchus asiaticus, a bird species
- Euronychodon asiaticus, a dinosaur species

== See also ==
- Asiaticus (disambiguation)
