= Decimus Valerius Asiaticus (Legatus of Gallia Belgica) =

1st century AD Roman Senator who served as a Legatus of Gallia Belgica

Governor of Gallia Belgica
- In office 69–70
- Emperors: Nero; Galba; Otho; Vitellius; Vespasian
- Preceded by: Unknown
- Succeeded by: Unknown (next known governor being Quintus Glitius Atilius Agricola)

Personal details
- Born: c. 35
- Died: c. 70
- Citizenship: Roman
- Spouse: Vitellia (disputed)
- Children: Marcus Lollius Paullinus Decimus Valerius Asiaticus Saturninus
- Parent(s): Decimus Valerius Asiaticus; Lollia Saturnina (disputed)
- Occupation: Politician

Decimus Valerius Asiaticus (35 – after 69 AD) was a Roman senator who served as the governor of Gallia Belgica.

== Family background and early life ==
Asiaticus was of praetorian rank. He was the son of the Roman Senator, consul Decimus Valerius Asiaticus and Lollia Saturnina, although it has been argued that she was his wife rather than mother. There is a possibility he may have had siblings. He and his family had their origins in Vienna, Gallia Narbonensis.

The father of Asiaticus was of Allobrogian origin and his political career was a contemporary of the rule of the Roman emperors Tiberius, Caligula and Claudius. His father was a respected, wealthy, and prominent Roman Senator. The elder Asiaticus in 35 served as a suffect consul and again in 46, served as an ordinary consul. He was the first man from Gaul to attain the consulship and became the first man from Gaul to be admitted into the Roman Senate.

The mother of Asiaticus was the social and beautiful Lollia Saturnina, whose younger sister Lollia Paulina was a Roman empress and the third wife of the Roman emperor Caligula. Saturnina was the first daughter of Marcus Lollius and the noble woman Volusia Saturnina, who was first cousin to the Roman emperor Tiberius. The father of Asiaticus was murdered on the orders of the Roman empress Valeria Messalina in 47 and the junior Asiaticus was later raised by his mother.

== Political career ==
After serving as a Legatus of Gallia Belgica, he became the Roman governor of that province in the reign of the Roman emperor Nero. In early 69 when Aulus Vitellius became Roman emperor, he was finding governors and commanders in the provinces as supporters for his emperorship who were genuinely enthusiastic. Among those supporters was Asiaticus. When Vitellius was in the city of Lugdunum in Gaul, proclaiming his son and daughter as heirs from his wife Galeria Fundana, Vitellius betrothed his daughter Vitellia to Asiaticus. Asiaticus and Vitellia had married in the reign of Vitellius.

He had become powerful through wealth and the skilful exploitation of imperial patronage. The alliance with Asiaticus and Vitellius was perhaps an attempt to reconcile the communities in Gaul with the Roman state. Asiaticus was unable to give Vitellius much support when the Roman army commanders appointed Vespasian as an alternative successor to Vitellius.

When Vespasian became Roman emperor in the second half of 69, Asiaticus was appointed for a consulship in 70. Before he could serve his consulship in early 70, Asiaticus died.

Asiaticus was survived by Vitellia and their son Marcus Lollius Paulinus Decimus Valerius Asiaticus Saturninus. Later in 70, Vespasian arranged for Vitellia to remarry another unnamed groom. Her second marriage was a splendid match for her and Vespasian provided for her the dowry and clothing.

== Sources ==
- The Roman World: Gallia Narbonensis's Urbs of Vienna
- Decimus Valerius Asiaticus: A notable Gallo-Roman from Vienna in the 1st century, translated from French to English
- article of Decimus Valerius Asiaticus by P.J. Sijpesteijn of University of Amsterdam, 1989
- Marcus Lollius’ article at Livius.org
- Genealogy of M. Lollius by D.C. O’Driscoll
- Epilogue: The Fall of the Vitellii - Vitellia?, daughter
- E.M. Wightman, Gallia Belgica, University of California Press, 1985
- T.P. Wiseman, Talking to Virgil: A Miscellany, University of Exeter Press, 1992
- A.K. Bowman, E. Champlin & A. Lintott, The Cambridge Ancient History, Volume 10, Cambridge University Press, 1996
- R. Alston, Aspects of Roman History AD 14-117, Routledge, 2002
- G. Morgan, 69 AD: The Year of Four Emperors, Oxford University Press, 2005
- A. Freisenbruch, The First Ladies of Rome: The Women Behind the Caesars (Google eBook), Random House, 2011
