= Lollia gens =

Ancient Roman family

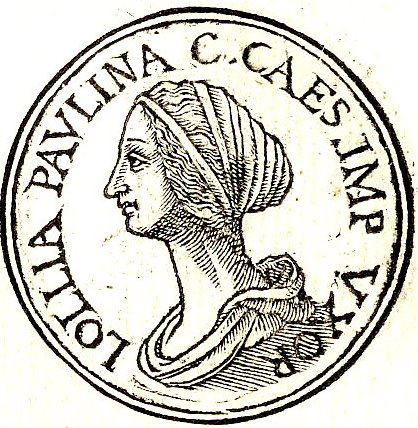
Empress Lollia Paulina from Promptuarii Iconum Insigniorum

The gens Lollia was a plebeian family at Rome. Members of the gens do not appear at Rome until the last century of the Republic. The first of the family to obtain the consulship was Marcus Lollius, in 21 BC.

== Origin ==
The Lollii appear to have been either of Samnite or Sabine origin, for a Samnite of this name is mentioned in the war with Pyrrhus and Marcus Lollius Palicanus, who was tribune of the plebs in 71 BC, is described as a native of Picenum.

== Praenomina ==
The praenomina used by the Lollii included Quintus, Marcus, Lucius and Gnaeus.

== Branches and cognomina ==
The only cognomen of the Lollii in the time of the Republic was Palicanus, but others appear under the Empire.

== Members ==
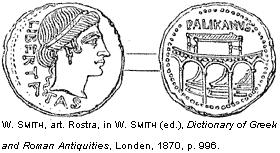
Coin with Marcus Lollius Palicanus (obverse) and rostra (reverse)

This list includes abbreviated praenomina. For an explanation of this practice, see filiation.

- Lollius, a Samnite hostage during the war with Pyrrhus, escaped in 269 BC, and headed a band of outlaws before being recaptured by the consuls.
- Quintus Lollius, an elderly eques in Sicilia, mistreated during the administration of Verres, from 73 to 71 BC.
- Marcus Lollius Q. f., appeared on behalf of his father at the trial of Verres.
- Quintus Lollius Q. f., murdered while traveling to Sicilia in order to gather evidence against Verres.
- Lucius Lollius, a legate of Gnaeus Pompeius during the Mithridatic War.
- Gnaeus Lollius, triumvir nocturnus, condemned together with his colleagues, for arriving too late to extinguish a fire in the Via Sacra.
- Marcus Lollius Palicanus, tribune of the plebs in 71 BC, was a prominent reformer, and an opponent of tyranny and the abuse of power. He was a supporter of Pompeius, as well as the victims of Verres. He had reached the Praetorship in 69 BC, but was foiled of the consulship by Gaius Piso.
- Lollia, the wife of Aulus Gabinius, and mother of Aulus Gabinius Sisenna. She may have been a daughter of the tribune Palicanus. She was mistress of Caesar.
- Marcus Lollius, father of the consul of 21 BC.
- Marcus Lollius M. f., was consul in 21 BC, and guardian of Gaius Julius Caesar, one the grandsons of Augustus.
- Lollius M. f. M. n, a Roman soldier who served in Hispania against the Cantabri.
- Marcus Lollius M. f. M. n., son of the consul of 21 BC.
- Lollius Bassus, a native of Smyrna and the author of ten epigrams in the Greek Anthology, the last of which, on the death of Germanicus, places it about AD 19.
- Lollia M. f. M. n. Saturnina, the wife of Decimus Valerius Asiaticus, and a mistress of Caligula. She became the mother of Marcus Lollius Paulinus Decimus Valerius Asiaticus Saturninus, consul suffectus in AD 93.
- Lollia M. f. M. n. Paulina, the wife of Publius Memmius Regulus, and later of Caligula, whom she married in AD 38.
- Quintus Lollius Alcamenes, decurio and duumvir of an unknown municipium.
- Marcus Lollius Senecio, a probable Numidian landowner and father of Quintus Lollius Urbicus.
- Quintus Lollius Urbicus, appointed governor of Britannia by Antoninus Pius in AD 138.
- Marcus Lollius Alexander, an engraver of gems, and husband of Flavia Sabina, built a sepulchre at Rome for himself and his family.

== See also ==
- List of Roman gentes

== Bibliography ==
- Quintus Horatius Flaccus (Horace), Epistulae.
- Dionysius of Halicarnassus, Romaike Archaiologia.
- Valerius Maximus, Factorum ac Dictorum Memorabilium (Memorable Facts and Sayings).
- Publius Cornelius Tacitus, Annales.
- Gaius Suetonius Tranquillus, De Vita Caesarum (Lives of the Caesars, or The Twelve Caesars).
- Appianus Alexandrinus (Appian), Bella Mithridatica (The Mithridatic Wars).
- Joannes Zonaras, Epitome Historiarum (Epitome of History).
- Anthologia Graeca (The Greek Anthology), ed. Tauchnitz.
- Angelo Mai (Angelus Maius), Scriptorum Veterum Nova Collectio, e Vaticanus Codicibus Edita (New Collection of Ancient Writers, Compiled from the Vatican Collection), Vatican Press, Rome (1825–1838).
- Dictionary of Greek and Roman Biography and Mythology, William Smith, ed., Little, Brown and Company, Boston (1849).
- John Hazel, Who’s Who in the Roman World, Psychology Press (2001).
- Geoffrey Rickman, Roman Granaries and Store Buildings, Cambridge University Press (1971).
- Anthony A. Barrett, Agrippina: Sex, Power and Politics in the Early Empire, Taylor & Francis (2002).
- Charles Freeman. Egypt, Greece, and Rome, Oxford University Press, ISBN 0-19-872194-3 (1999).
