= Marcus Servilius Nonianus =

Roman historian and senator (died 59 AD)

Consul of the Roman Empire
- In office January 35 – June 35 Serving with Gaius Cestius Gallus
- Preceded by: Quintus Marcius Barea Soranus with Titus Rustius Nummius Gallus
- Succeeded by: Decimus Valerius Asiaticus with Aulus Gabinius Secundus

Personal details
- Born: Unknown
- Died: 59 Rome
- Spouse: Considia
- Children: Servilia Considia

Military service
- Allegiance: Roman Empire
- Commands: Governor of Africa

Marcus Servilius Nonianus (died in 59 AD) was a Roman senator, best known as a historian. He was ordinary consul in 35 as the colleague of Gaius Cestius Gallus. Tacitus described Servilius Nonianus as a man of great eloquence and good-nature. He wrote a history of Rome which is considered the major contribution on the topic between the works of Livy and Tacitus, and which was much referred to by later historians, but was later lost. A number of anecdotes regarding him survive and help to give an understanding of Roman life in the first century.

== Life ==
Nonianus was descended from Gaius Servilius Geminus, the praetor who had renounced his Patrician status. His father was Marcus Servilius, consul in AD 3 and his mother the daughter of the Nonius whom Mark Antony proscribed over the possession of a gem. He was proconsular governor of Africa in 46–47.

Pliny the Elder recounts several anecdotes concerning Nonianus. One was that he was terribly worried about losing his sight and to prevent this, Nonianus wore a lucky charm around his neck consisting of the two Greek letters alpha and rho. Pliny reports that the charm worked. Another anecdote was that his daughter was cured of an illness with goats' milk, as advised by the family doctor Servilius Democrates. The poet Persius revered Nonianus like a father, according to the historian Ronald Syme.

Nonianus married Considia; their daughter Servilia Considia married the senator Quintus Marcius Barea Soranus. This marriage and the admiration Persius had for him, led Syme to suspect Nonianus was part of the Stoic circle of the Principate. Tacitus dates the death of Servilius Nonianus to 59, contrasting his elegant life to another senator who died that year, Domitius Afer, who possessed the same genius yet was a provincial.

== Historical work ==
Servilius Nonianus wrote a book on the history of Rome but the work is not extant. Even its title is unknown. According to Tacitus and Quintilian this work was considered a very important reference book on Roman history, especially for those historians who belonged to the senatorial party. It is considered to be the leading Roman history between the works of Livy and Tacitus.

Quintilian writes that Servilius Nonianus used publicly to read his own work, Recitationes. Several scholars have suggested Tacitus drew on Servilius Nonianus for his history of the first Imperial period, along with the historian Aufidius Bassus. The period covered by Nonianus' history is unknown. It is considered probable that Nonianus also covered the reign of the emperor Tiberius.

Pliny the Younger records the anecdote that during one of the public recitationes of Nonianus, the emperor Claudius, who was strolling nearby, was so attracted by the applause that he asked who was reading, and joined the audience.

== Sources ==
- Olivier Devillers: Tacite et les sources des Annales. Leuven 2003.
- Michael M. Sage: "Tacitus’ Historical Works: A Survey and Appraisal," Aufstieg und Niedergang der römischen Welt, Vol. II.33.2. Berlin-New York 1990, pp. 851–1030.
- Ronald Syme, Tacitus. 2 volumes. Oxford 1958.
- Ronald Syme, "The Historian Servilius Nonianus" Hermes, 92 (1964), pp. 408ff.

Political offices
Preceded by Q. Marcius Barea Soranus; T. Rustius Nummius Gallus as suffecti	Consul of the Roman Empire; January–June 35 with Gaius Cestius Gallus	Succeeded by D. Valerius Asiaticus; A. Gabinius Secundus as suffecti
