= Marcus Lollius (father of Lollia Paulina) =

- Spouse: Volusia Saturnina
- Children: Lollia Paulina; Lollia Saturnina
- Parents: Marcus Lollius (father); Aurelia (mother)

Marcus Lollius was a Roman Senator who was active in the second half of 1st century BC and first half of 1st century. He is best remembered as the father of empress Lollia Paulina.

== Family background ==
Lollius was a member of the plebeian gens Lollia. He was the son of the Roman senator and Military Officer Marcus Lollius and his wife Aurelia. Ronald Syme identifies Aurelia as "a sister of the postulated and unattested Aurelius Cotta who adopted the younger son of Messalla Corvinus". Lollius was the namesake of his father and paternal grandfather. Publius Lollius Maximus may have been his brother, or at least a close relation.

Some sources have provided Lollius with the cognomen "Paulinus" due to his daughters name, but it is nowhere attested and is more likely that empress Lollia Paulina derived her surname from her maternal grandmother Nonia Polla instead.

== Career ==
Little is known on the life of Lollius. The Horrea Lolliana was either built by his father or Lollius himself. It is known from the inscriptions refer to them and also, from their plan in the Severan Marble Plan of Rome. It seems his family had long trade connections and his family's name is found among the Italian merchants on the Greek island of Delos in the Hellenistic period.

Due to a passage in Tacitus, a number of scholars have argued that Lollius was a suffect consul, possibly even in AD 13. However, Ronald Syme pointed out that Lollius could never have been consul due to the disgrace of his father in 2 BC, which resulted in a prolonged antipathy towards him by Tiberius. "When requesting the Senate to honor Sulpicius Quirinius with a public funeral," Syme writes, "and recounting his merits and his loyalty, the Princeps was put in mind of the Rhodian years and could not suppress harsh words about Lollius." Syme proposes an emendation that would make the passage refer to the elder Lollius, not this one. Providing a definite solution is the findings of Diana Gorostidi Pi, who completed the list of consuls for this year and showed there is no room for Lollius here.

== Wife and issue ==
Lollius married a Roman noblewoman called Volusia Saturnina, a daughter to the consul Lucius Volusius Saturninus and his wife Nonia Polla. Her paternal grandmother was Claudia, aunt of the emperor Tiberius.

Through Volusia, Lollius was the father of two daughters:

- Lollia Saturnina
- Lollia Paulina, third wife of Caligula.

== Sources ==
- Horace - Edited by O.A.W Dilke, Horace: Epistles Book I, Taylor & Francis
- G. Highet, The Classical Tradition: Greek and Roman Influences on Western Literature, Oxford University Press, 1949
- G. Rickman, Roman Granaries and Store Buildings, CUP Archive, 1971
- S.J. Harrison, Homage to Horace: A Bimillenary Celebration, Oxford University Press, 1995
