= Gaius Caninius Rebilus (consul 12 BC) =

Roman senator

Gaius Caninius Rebilus (died 12 BC) was a Roman senator who was appointed suffect consul in 12 BC with Lucius Volusius Saturninus as his colleague.

== Biography ==
Caninius Rebilus was the son of Gaius Caninius Rebilus, suffect consul in 45 BC. A member of the Quindecimviri, he was listed for a suffect consulship in 11 BC. However, in 12 BC he was appointed suffect consul, replacing Valgius Rufus. He died while still serving in office. His son was probably Gaius Caninius Rebilus, the suffect consul of AD 37.

== Sources ==
- Syme, Ronald (1989). The Augustan Aristocracy. Clarendon Press. ISBN 978-0-19-814731-2.

Political offices
Preceded by Gaius Valgius Rufus; Publius Sulpicius Quirinius	Consul of the Roman Empire; 12 BC (suffect) with Lucius Volusius Saturninus	Succeeded by Quintus Aelius Tubero; Paullus Fabius Maximus
