= Lollia (wife of Aulus Gabinius) =

Wife of Roman general Aulus Gabinius

- Born: Rome
- Died: Rome
- Known for: Wife of Aulus Gabinius, mistress of Julius Caesar
- Spouse: Aulus Gabinius
- Children: Aulus Gabinius Sisenna

Lollia was an Ancient Roman noblewoman. She was the wife of Roman general Aulus Gabinius. She was also a mistress of Julius Caesar.

== Biography ==
Lollia was a Plebeian of the gens Lollia. She may have been a daughter of Marcus Lollius Palicanus, who was tribune of the plebs in 71 BC. Lollia married Aulus Gabinius and they had the son Aulus Gabinius Sisenna together. Some time during their marriage she became a mistress of Julius Caesar. Lollia does not seem to have suffered any loss of public image or marriage issues because of the affair.

She and her husband are both mentioned in a letter from Cicero in which he implies that they both were sexually involved with the revolutionary Catiline, and that Gabinius might have pimped her out.

== Cultural depictions ==
Lollia appears in the historical novel Respublica: A Novel of Cicero's Roman Republic by Richard Braccia. In the book it is described by another character that Gabinus won Caesar's trust by letting him have sex with Lollia. The affair is also depicted in the novel Lustrum by Robert Harris.

== See also ==
- List of Roman gentes
- Women in Rome
