= Marcus Annius Libo (consul 161) =

Roman senator, consul and governor (died 163)

Marcus Annius Libo (died 163) was a Roman senator. He was suffect consul in the nundinium of January-April 161 with Quintus Camurius Numisius Junior as his colleague. Libo was the nephew of emperor Antoninus Pius, and cousin to emperor Marcus Aurelius.

== Early life ==
Libo came from a Roman family that had settled in Hispania generations before, and had returned to Rome more recently. His father was Marcus Annius Libo, consul in 128, and his mother was a noblewoman whose name has been surmised as Fundania, daughter of Lucius Fundanius Lamia Aelianus, consul in 116. Libo had a sister, Annia Fundania Faustina, wife of Titus Pomponius Proculus Vitrasius Pollio, whose second consulship was in 176.

== Governor of Syria ==
The only portion of his cursus honorum we know is the portion immediately after Libo stepped down from his consulate. To support his co-emperor Lucius Verus' campaign against the Parthians, Marcus Aurelius appointed Libo governor of the province of Syria. Anthony Birley notes this was a surprising choice. "As Libo had been consul only the previous year, 161," writes Birley, "he must have been in his early thirties, and as a patrician must have lacked military experience." Syria was an important province, and the men picked to govern it were usually senior men with much military and administrative experience. Birley answers his own question, "It seems that Marcus' intention was to have on the spot a man he could rely."

As governor, Libo quarreled with the emperor Lucius, taking the attitude that he would only follow the instructions that Marcus gave him. This angered Lucius, so when Libo suddenly died, rumor claimed that Lucius had Libo poisoned.

== Family ==
When Libo died, Lucius Verus defied Marcus and married Libo's widow to his Greek freedman called Agaclytus. Accordingly, Marcus Aurelius attended neither the ceremony nor the banquet. Christian Settipani has proposed that based on the name of Libo's son Marcus Annius Sabinus Libo that it is possible that his widow may have been a relative of empress Vibia Sabina, but that his grandson Marcus Annius Flavius Libo's name makes it more likely that his widow was a member of the Flavii Sabini.

Political offices
Preceded by Marcus Aurelius Caesar III, and Lucius Aelius Aurelius Commodus II as Ordinary consuls	Suffect consul of the Roman Empire; 161 with Quintus Camurius Numisius Junior	Succeeded by Julius Geminus Capellianus, and Titus Flavius Boethus as Suffect consuls
