= Aulus Larcius Macedo =

Aulus Larcius Macedo was a Roman senator active in the early second century AD. He served as suffect consul for the nundinium of May to August 124 with Publius Ducenius Verres as his colleague. He is known primarily from inscriptions.

Despite sharing the name of an ancient Patrician family, Macedo's origins were humble. His grandfather, Aulus Larcius Lydus, was a freedman; Cassius Dio mentions a Larcius Lydus who offered Nero one million sesterces to perform on the lyre; if they are the same man, it would suggest his grandfather had accumulated a fortune and used part of it to buy his freedom during the reign of that emperor. It is possible that his grandfather had been the slave of an ancestor of Aulus Larcius Priscus, consul in 110. Werner Eck writes there is no doubt that the homonymous senator Aulus Larcius Macedo, who achieved the rank of praetor, is the father of the consul. The older Macedo is best known as a slave owner whose cruelty provoked some of his slaves to murder him in his baths.

Little is known of the consular Macedo's career in service to the emperors. His one attested office was prior to his consulship, when he served as governor of Galatia from 119 to 123. His administration of Galatia is notable only for the evidence of extensive road maintenance; at least nineteen mile posts with Macedo's name have been recovered from the parts of Turkey that had been Roman Galatia.

== See also ==
- Lartia gens

Political offices
Preceded by Manius Acilius Glabrio; C. Bellicius Flaccus Torquatus Tebanianus as ordinarii	Consul of the Roman Empire; May–August AD 124 with Publius Ducenius Verres	Succeeded by Gaius Julius Gallus; Gaius Valerius Severus as suffecti
