= Marcus Annius Flavius Libo =

Late 2nd/early 3rd century Roman senator and consul

Marcus Annius Flavius Libo was a Roman Senator who lived in the second half of the 2nd century and first half of the 3rd century. He was consul ordinarius in AD 204 with Lucius Fabius Cilo as his senior colleague.

Libo was a Patrician and came from Hispania Baetica. His grandfather was Marcus Annius Libo, who was made suffect consul in 161 and was legatus of Syria and may have been poisoned, possibly by his cousin, Lucius Verus. Libo was related to Lucius Verus through their mutual ancestor, Marcus Annius Verus, who was consul three times, and by marriage to Emperor Antoninus Pius, who married his grandfather's sister.

== Career ==
His career began under the reign of Marcus Aurelius when he held some form of public honor in 179. Following the assassinations of Commodus, Pertinax, and Didius Julianus in 192 and 193 respectively, his family likely aligned with the interests of Septimius Severus. This emperor subsequently appointed him as consul ordinarius in 204.

Political offices
Preceded by Gaius Fulvius Plautianus, P. Septimius Geta	Consul of the Roman Empire; 204 with Lucius Fabius Cilo	Succeeded by Caracalla, Publius Septimius Geta
