= Aulus Gabinius Secundus (consul 35) =

1st century AD Roman senator and general

Aulus Gabinius Secundus was a Roman senator and general who was active during the reign of Tiberius. He was suffect consul for the second half of the year 35 as the colleague of Decimus Valerius Asiaticus.

Following his consulate, Secundus was appointed legatus or commander of the army in Germania Inferior. In 41, Secundus led a successful campaign against the Germanic tribe of the Chauci, who had settled on the North Sea coast between the Elbe and Ems rivers. These Germans had made themselves unpopular with the Romans by their raids and their connection with the neighbouring Frisii. The Chauci had also fought on the side of Arminius in the Battle of the Teutoburg Forest in the year 9, in which the Germans destroyed three Roman legions, a vicious defeat the Romans remembered well. Secundus gained much prestige by recovering the last of the three battle eagles that had been lost in the battle. For this achievement, and Sulpicius Galba's victory against the Chatti that same year, the emperor Claudius took the title imperator. Gabinius was awarded the right to use the surname Chaucius.

Despite Secundus' victory, however, the Chauci did not submit. Within six years, they resumed their raids and with their light pirate ships plundered the Gallic coast.

The homonymous consul of the year 43 is likely his son.

Political offices
Preceded by Gaius Cestius Gallus, and Marcus Servilius Nonianus as Ordinary consuls	Suffect consul of the Roman Empire; 35 with Decimus Valerius Asiaticus	Succeeded by Sextus Papinius Allenius, and Quintus Plautius as Ordinary consuls
