= Aulus Larcius Macedo The Elder =

Roman nobleman

Aulus Larcius Macedo the Elder was a Roman nobleman of pretorian rank and father of Aulus Larcius Macedo the Younger. Little is known about his early life, but Pliny the Younger mentions that he is the son of a freedman. He is most famous for his death at the hands of his slaves, as described in Pliny's Letters 3.14.

Pliny writes that:

A terrible thing, worthy of more than just a letter, has been suffered at the hands of his slaves by Larcius Macedo, a man of praetorian rank, a haughty and savage master who remembered too little — or rather too well — that his own father had been a slave. He was bathing in his villa at Formiae. Suddenly his slaves surround him. One attacks his throat, another strikes his face, another his chest and belly, and even (disgusting to say) batters his private parts; and when they thought he was dead, they threw him down on the heated stone pavement to test whether he was alive. Either because he was unconscious, or because he was pretending to be unconscious, he lay outstretched and motionless and convinced them that he was entirely dead. Only then is he carried out, as if he had been overcome by the heat. His more faithful slaves take him up, and his concubines come running with howling and shouts. Roused by their cries and revived by the coolness of the place he shows by opening his eyes and moving his body (as it was now safe) that he is still alive. The slaves scatter; most of them have been captured, the rest are being sought. He himself, kept alive with difficulty for a few days, passed away, not without the consolation of vengeance, avenged while he was alive as those who have been murdered are avenged. You see how many dangers, how many outrages, how many insults we are exposed to; nor is it possible for anyone to be safe just because he is lenient and kind; for it is not by rational calculation that masters are murdered, but by viciousness.
