= Quintus Marcius Barea Soranus (consul 34) =

1st century AD Roman senator

Quintus Marcius Barea Soranus was a Roman senator who lived in the first half of the first century AD.

== Life ==
He was a member of the gens Marcia, which claimed descent from Ancus Marcius, the third king of Rome.

He was suffect consul in 34 with Titus Rustius Nummius Gallus, and proconsul of Africa from 41 to 43.

An inscription found in Hippo Regius provides information about Soranus. His filiation in this inscription attests that his father's praenomen was Gaius. Soranus was one of the quindecimviri sacris faciundis, the collegium of Roman priests entrusted with the care of the Sibylline oracles, as well as having been appointed a fetial.

Other inscriptions recovered from the former province attest to his influence there: Soranus enfranchised a number of Africans, who afterwards used his gentilicium "Marcius" as their own.

== Family ==
Soranus is known to have two sons: Quintus Marcius Barea Soranus, suffect consul of 52; and Quintus Marcius Barea Sura, the grandfather of Trajan.

Political offices
Preceded by Paullus Fabius Persicus, and Lucius Vitellius as Ordinary consuls	Suffect consul of the Roman Empire; 34 with Titus Rustius Nummius Gallus	Succeeded by Gaius Cestius Gallus, and Marcus Servilius Nonianus as Ordinary consuls
