= Gaius Cestius Gallus (consul 35) =

Roman senator

Gaius Cestius Gallus was a Roman senator active during the mid-first century AD. He was ordinary consul for the year 35 with Servilius Nonianus as his colleague. Suetonius describes him as "a lecherous old spendthrift" and states that the emperor Augustus had expelled him from the Senate for his shameful behavior. The emperor Tiberius reprimanded Gallus for his debauched ways, but a few days later the emperor responded to an invitation to one of his banquets on condition that it followed Gallus' usual routine—and that the serving girls be naked.

Besides the notice of his consulate, Gallus appears twice in the pages of Tacitus. The first is in his account of AD 21, when Gallus is reported to have made a speech in the Senate complaining that "the vilest wretches" would slander "respectable citizens" then escape punishment for their harm by clutching a statue of the emperor; in his speech, Gallus mentions specifically one Annia Rufilla. (It is unknown if Annia Rufilla had spoken about Cestius Gallus.) His speech provoked a response from the assembled body that forced Drusus the Younger to order Annia Rufilla summoned, convicted, and confined to the common prison.

His second appearance is in the account of the year 32, in the aftermath of the fall of Sejanus. Tiberius prompted Gallus to read to the Senate a letter he sent the emperor, in which he accused the ex-praetor Quintus Servaeus and the equestrian Minucius Thermus of being supporters of the feared but now dead praetorian prefect. In response to Gallus' prosecution, the two then offered up Julius Africanus and Seius Quadratus as other associates of Sejanus to avoid proscription.

Gallus is known to have had at least one son, Gaius Cestius Gallus, suffect consul in 42.

Political offices
Preceded by Q. Marcius Barea Soranus; T. Rustius Nummius Gallus as suffecti	Roman consul 35 with Servilius Nonianus	Succeeded by D. Valerius Asiaticus; A. Gabinius Secundus as suffecti
