= Volusia Saturnina =

Roman noblewoman

Volusia Latina Saturnina
- Spouse: Marcus Lollius
- Children: Lollia Saturnina; Lollia Paulina
- Parents: Lucius Volusius Saturninus (father); Nonia Polla (mother)

Volusia Latina Saturnina, was a Roman noble woman who lived in the Roman Empire in the second half of the 1st century BC and first half of the first century AD.

== Family background ==
Saturnina came from an ancient and distinguished senatorial family, that never rose above the praetorship which was of eques status.

She was the daughter of the suffect consul Lucius Volusius Saturninus by his wife Nonia Polla. Volusia Saturnina was a first cousin once removed to Roman emperor Tiberius and his brother, the General Nero Claudius Drusus. Her brother was the suffect consul Lucius Volusius Saturninus.

== Marriage and issue ==
Saturnina married Marcus Lollius, the son of the consul and military leader Marcus Lollius and his wife Aurelia. Aurelia was a sister to the Roman Senator Marcus Aurelius Cotta Maximus Messalinus.

Saturnina and Lollius had two daughters:

- Lollia Saturnina
- Lollia Paulina

== Sources ==
- Tacitus - The Annals of Imperial Rome
- G. Rickman, Roman Granaries and Store Buildings, CUP Archive, 1971
- M. Hainzmann & P. Schubert, Corpus inscriptionum Latinarum, Walter de Gruyter, 1987
- Lollia Gens article at ancient library
- Marcus Lollius no. 5 article at ancient library
- Quintus Volusius no.2 article at ancient library
- Romeins Imperium – Lucius Quintus Volusius Saturninus translated from Dutch to English
- Genealogy of Volusius Saturninus by D.C. O’Driscoll
- Marcus Lollius’ article at Livius.org
