= Quintus Aelius Tubero (consul) =

1st-century BC Roman senator and consul

Quintus Aelius Tubero (fl. 17–11 BC) was a Roman senator. He was one of the priestly quindecimviri sacris faciundis who oversaw the celebration of the Saecular Games in 17 BC. He held the office of consul in 11 BC with Paullus Fabius Maximus. Rüpke and Glock date his appointment to the College of Priests about 21 BC.

He was a son of Quintus Aelius Tubero, the jurist and historian, and a daughter of the jurist Servius Sulpicius Rufus. His brother was Sextus Aelius Catus, consul in AD 4. The family was raised to patrician rank by the emperor Augustus. He was also the maternal uncle of the jurist Gaius Cassius Longinus, and probably a paternal cousin (according to Sumner) of the notorious Lucius Aelius Sejanus. Tubero was also probably an uncle of Aelia Paetina, wife of the emperor Claudius.

Political offices
Preceded by Gaius Caninius Rebilus; Lucius Volusius Saturninus as suffect consuls	Roman consul 11 BC with Paullus Fabius Maximus	Succeeded by Africanus Fabius Maximus; Iullus Antonius
