= Lucius Titius Epidius Aquilinus =

Lucius Titius Epidius Aquilinus was a Roman senator of the second century.

== Life ==
He was ordinary consul in the year 125 as the colleague of Marcus Lollius Paulinus Decimus Valerius Asiaticus Saturninus. He is primarily known from inscriptions.

He married Avidia Plautia, daughter of Plautia. It is likely that Aquilinus was the father of Plautius Quintillus, ordinary consul of 159, and Lucius Titius Plautius Aquilinus, ordinary consul of 162. Details of Aquilinus' cursus honorum have not yet been recovered.

Political offices
Preceded by Gaius Julius Gallus, and Gaius Valerius Severus as suffect consuls	Consul of the Roman Empire; 125 with Marcus Lollius Paulinus Decimus Valerius Asiaticus Saturninus II	Succeeded by Quintus Vetina Verus, and Publius Lucius Cosconianus as suffect consuls
