= Publius Lollius Maximus =

Roman soldier and acquaintance of the poet Horace

Publius Lollius Maximus also known as Lollius Maximus and Maximus Lollius was a Roman soldier who lived in the 1st century BC and served under the first Roman emperor Augustus.

== Family ==
Maximus was a member of the plebeian gens Lollia. His name is often mentioned in Latin poetry and occurs in a later inscription.

The father of Maximus had owned a country estate. His father may have been Marcus Lollius consul in 21 BC, or at least a very close relation of the elder Lollius who was in high favor with Augustus. If so, his immediate family would have included Marcus Lollius as his brother, and he could have been the uncle of Lollia Saturnina and the Roman empress Lollia Paulina.

== Career and Horace ==
Maximus had served as a Roman soldier in Hispania, fighting against the Cantabri under Augustus from 27 BC until 25 BC. When Maximus returned to Rome from Hispania, he became a student of Rhetoric. Maximus, although a younger man, became a friend of the Roman Poet Horace.

Horace's Epistles I, 2 and 18 are addressed to Maximus. In Epistle 2, Horace advises Maximus to read the epic poems of Homer again, to find a better expounder of ethics than the philosophers (1-4). Horace wants Maximus to learn what follies to avoid from the Iliad (5-16) and what virtues to cultivate from the Odyssey (17-26).

In Epistle 18, Horace reveals the career of Maximus. He is experiencing problems being a courtier. If his nobility is recent, this might expose Maximus to all sort of snubs in the hierarchy of Roman society. Horace is advising Maximus that affability is the mean between toadying and truculence, and is a virtue in social relationships. If he wants to maintain his position he will need to be accommodating in an agreeable way.

Maximus must learn to respect the wishes of his superior's frien. In the Epistle, Horace never reveals who is Maximus’ superior friend, however he may have been a personage of noble descent as he is someone who enjoys a re-creation of the Battle of Actium in a country fish-pond. Maximus needs advice on treading the path of independence with a hierarchical aristocracy now transforming itself into a royal court. Maximus seems already on top and secure with his wealth, success, high-born friends; at some point in due course he would want to remove his himself from the world.

At this time Maximus may have turned his hand to poetry and must have been offered a post in the Retinue of the future Roman emperor Tiberius. This event may have taken place in 20 BC.

== Historian ==
The English Poet of the Middle Ages Geoffrey Chaucer, who was the author of the poem, Troilus and Criseyde refers various times in the poem to Maximus, as myn auctor Lollius. Chaucer states that Maximus wrote an account of the Trojan War in Latin and in his poem, Troilus and Criseyde is just retelling the story. In another poem, The House of Fame, Chaucer introduces Maximus as a real historian. In The House of Fame, Chaucer puts Maximus on an iron pillar beside Dares and Homer.

Maximus being a possible historian might also be confirmed by Horace. In one of his Epistles, addressed to Maximus, Horace advises him to read Homer for the moral and philosophical content of the epics. He begins:

The writer of the Trojan war, Maximus Lollius,
while you practise speaking in Rome, I reread at Praeneste.

There is a possibility that Maximus could have been an ancient historian on Trojan history. Chaucer and his early readers could well have believed in Maximus' being an authority on history. However, there is no such historian, ancient or mediaeval, known to the world as Lollius Maximus. This claim can lead to a major literary discovery of a lost work.

== Sources ==
- Horace - Edited by O.A.W Dilke, Horace: Epistles Book I, Taylor & Francis
- D. Ferry & Q.H. Flaccus, The Epistles of Horace, Book I, CUP Archive, 1937
- G. Highet, The Classical Tradition: Greek and Roman Influences on Western Literature, Oxford University Press, 1949
- S.J. Harrison, Homage to Horace: A Bimillenary Celebration, Oxford University Press, 1995
- C. Skidmore, Practical Ethics for Roman Gentlemen: The Works of Valerius Maximus, University of Exeter Press, 1996
- G. Chaucer, Troilus and Criseyde: A New Translation, Oxford University Press, 1998
- Horace & Persius, The Satires of Horace and Persius (Google eBook), Penguin UK, 2005. ISBN 978-0-14-045508-3.
