= Titus Flavius Boethus =

Roman senator, consul and governor (died 168)

Titus Flavius Boethus (died 168) was a Roman senator, who was active during the reign of Marcus Aurelius. He is known as being an acquaintance of the physician Galen. Boethus was suffect consul in one of the nundinia falling in the later half of 161 with [? Julius] Geminus Capellianus as his colleague.

Boethus had his family origins in Ptolemais in Syria. His name suggests he is descended from a man whom either the emperor Vespasian or a relative of his gave the Roman citizenship to, but there is no record of any Flavian being governor of Syria. Otherwise there is no known relationship, familial or otherwise, between Boethus and the emperor.

== Life ==
At some point after Galen arrived in Rome in 162, he became the doctor for Boethus' wife and son, and thus became acquainted with the consul. Boethus encouraged Galen to offer public lectures on anatomy, which Galen offered over a three-year period. G.W. Bowersock notes that these lectures were "very much to the taste of the people of that time", and includes in Galen's audience such prominent Senators as Marcus Vettulenus Civica Barbarus consul in 157, Lucius Sergius Paullus consul II in 168, and Gnaeus Claudius Severus consul II in 173.

Boethus was appointed governor of the imperial province of Syria Palaestina for the usual term of three years starting around 166. Before he departed, he obtained medical advice to follow while in that eastern province. Despite his advice, Boethus died while governor in 168.

Political offices
Preceded by Marcus Annius Libo, and Quintus Camurius Numisius Junior as suffect consuls	Suffect consul of the Roman Empire; 161 with [? Julius] Geminus Capellianus	Succeeded by Quintus Junius Rusticus II, and Lucius Titius Plautius Aquilinus as ordinary consuls
