= Africanus Fabius Maximus =

Roman senator

Africanus Fabius Maximus was a Roman senator. His elder brother was Paullus Fabius Maximus (consul 11 BC) and his sister was Fabia Paullina, who married Marcus Titius.

It is believed that Africanus was named in honour of his famous family ancestor Scipio Africanus Aemilianus.

== Career ==
The career of Africanus Fabius Maximus is much less clear than that of his brother. It is believed that Africanus' earliest post was as a military tribune in Spain, though this is not certain. His only two certain civilian posts were as ordinary consul in 10 BC (with Iullus Antonius), and as proconsul of Africa in 6/5 BC. He was admitted to the priesthood of the septemviri epulonum at some point after 25 BC.

It was during his tenure as proconsul of Africa that Africanus struck some coins that bore his own image.

== Possible family ==
Although no wife is attested for Africanus, it is possible that he had a daughter named Fabia Numantina. However, she was more probably the daughter of Africanus' brother, Paullus Fabius Maximus and his wife, Marcia.

== See also ==
- Fabia gens

== Footnotes ==
Political offices
Preceded by Quintus Aelius Tubero; Paullus Fabius Maximus	Roman consul 10 BC with Iullus Antonius	Succeeded by Nero Claudius Drusus; Titus Quinctius Crispinus Sulpicianus
