= Quintus Camurius Numisius Junior =

2nd century Roman senator, consul and legate

Quintus Camurius Numisius Junior was a Roman senator active during the later second century AD. He was suffect consul for a nundinium in the first half of the year 161 as the colleague of Marcus Annius Libo.

His gentilicium Camurius points to a connection with the Trajanic equites C. Camurius C. f. Clemens. While some authorities believe Numisius Junior was descended from the equites, Olli Salomies in his monograph on Imperial Roman naming practices believes it is more likely he was adopted by a brother of Clemens than Clemens himself. A number of inscriptions with his name at Attidium in Umbria indicate that city was his home. One mentions a woman who might be his wife, Stertinia L.f. Cocceia Bassula Venecia Aeliana Junior, and a man who might be his son, Quintus Cornelius Flaccus [Stertinus?] Noricus Numisius [Junior?]. Anthony Birley believes his wife Stertinia was a descendant of Lucius Stertinius Noricus, consul in 113.

== Career ==
His cursus honorum can be reconstructed from one of the inscriptions at Attidium. Numisius Junior began in his teens as one of the tresviri monetalis, the most prestigious of the four boards that comprise the vigintiviri; assignment to this board was usually allocated to patricians or favored individuals. This was followed by a commission as military tribune in Legio IX Hispana, stationed in Roman Britain; Birley dates this to the 140s. Junior was afterwards appointed quaestor, which he discharged at Rome; about this time he was admitted to the sodales Titalis Flaviales. He then advanced through the traditional Republican magistracies of curule aedile and praetor. Géza Alföldy estimates the date of this last office as around the year 150.

After stepping down as praetor, Junior was commissioned as legatus legionis or commander of two legions consecutively. The name of the first is lost, but Alföldy dates his command from about 152 to about 155. The second was Legio VI Victrix, and Alföldy dates his command of that legion from immediately after leaving the first legion to around 158. It was an unusual situation for a man to command more than one legion; Birley offers a list of no more than 30 men who had done so, and he notes that "where evidence is available, special circumstances can be seen to have brought about the iterated command." Birley attributes the cause in Junior's case to the critical military situation in Roman Britain during the mid-150s. "It is not unlikely," writes Birley, "that Numisius Junior had been commanding a legion on the Rhine, and was appointed to VI Victrix on the recommendation of Cn. Julius Verus, when the latter went from Germania Inferior to Britain. After concluding his command of the VI Victrix, Numisius Junior acceded to the consulate.

His life after the consulate is a blank.

Political offices
Preceded by Marcus Aurelius Caesar III, and Lucius Aelius Aurelius Commodus II as Ordinary consuls	Consul of the Roman Empire; AD 161 with Marcus Annius Libo	Succeeded by Julius Geminus Capellianus, and Titus Flavius Boethus as Suffect consuls
