= Lucius Titius Plautius Aquilinus =

2nd century Roman senator and consul

Lucius Titius Plautius Aquilinus was a Roman senator active during the middle of the second century AD.

== Life ==
He was ordinary consul for 162 as the colleague of Junius Rusticus. Aquilinus is known only from inscriptions, which include brick stamps and the tombstone of one of his slaves.

Descended from an Italian family, Aquilinus may have been the brother of Plautius Quintillus, consul in 159, and therefore the son of Lucius Titius Epidius Aquilinus, consul in 125, and an Avidia Plautia. Details of Aquilinus' senatorial career have not yet been recovered.

Political offices
Preceded by Julius Geminus Capellianus, and Titus Flavius Boethus as suffect consul	Consul of the Roman Empire; 162 with Junius Rusticus	Succeeded by Tiberius Claudius Paullinus, and Tiberius Claudius Pompeianus as suffect consul
