= Paullus Fabius Maximus =

Roman consul in 11 BC and a confidant of emperor Augustus

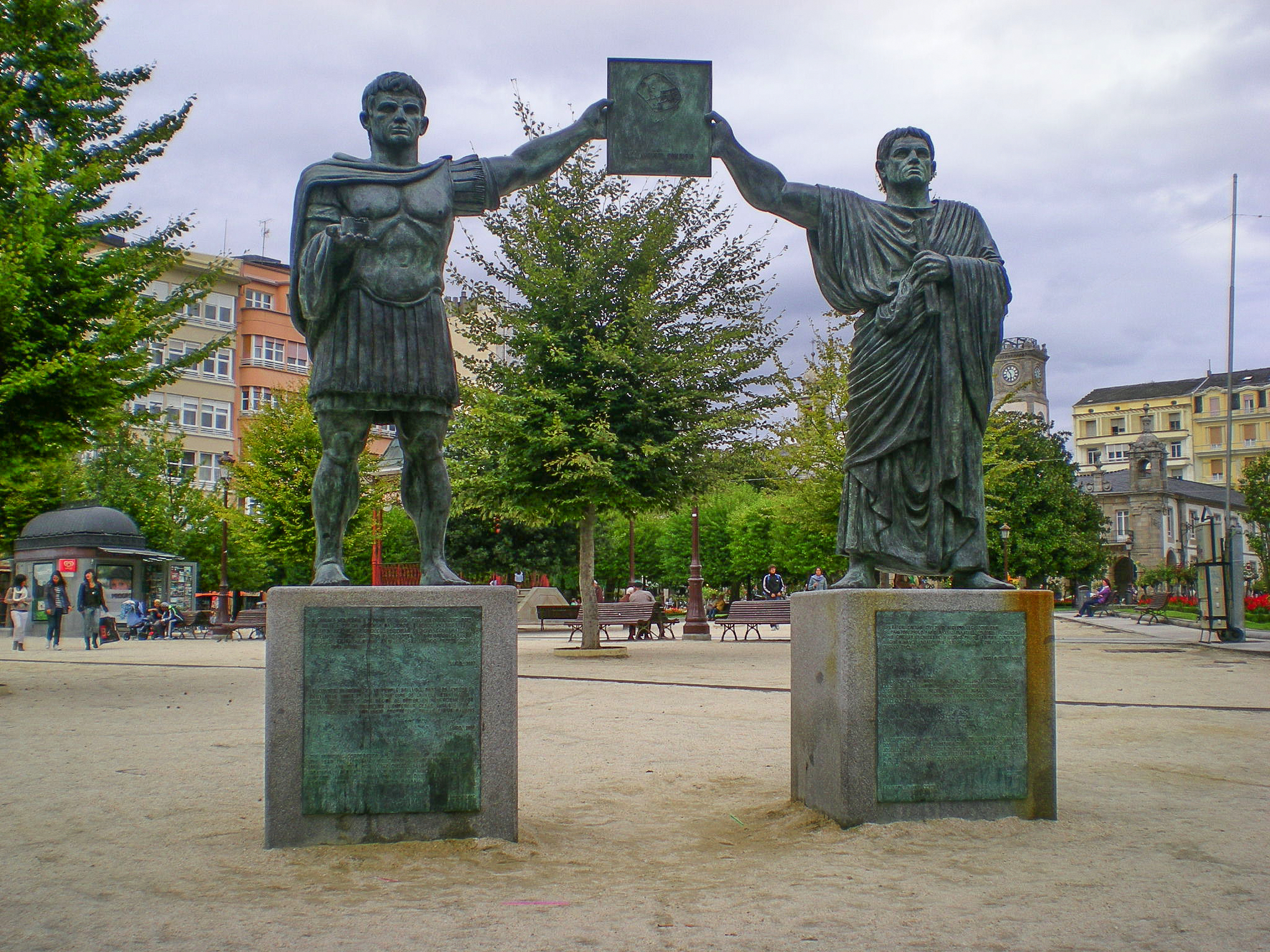
Fundadores de Lugo, commemorating the founding of the colonia of Lucus Augusti by Paullus Fabius Maximus.

Paullus Fabius Maximus (died AD 14) was a Roman senator, active toward the end of the first century BC. He was consul in 11 BC as the colleague of Quintus Aelius Tubero, and a confidant of emperor Augustus.

== Background ==
The patrician Fabii were one of the most ancient and illustrious families of Rome, but by the Late Republic their status had begun to wane. Ronald Syme notes that the Fabii had "missed a generation in the consulate."

Fabius was the elder son of Quintus Fabius Maximus, one of Caesar's legates during the Civil War, whom Caesar appointed consul suffectus on October 1, 45 BC. He was named after his ancestor, Lucius Aemilius Paullus Macedonicus. The elder Fabius died on the last day of his consulship, December 31, leaving Paullus, his younger brother, Africanus Fabius Maximus, and a sister, Fabia Paullina.

== Political career ==
Fabius' first known post was that of quaestor, in which capacity he served under Augustus during the emperor's travels through the eastern provinces from 22 to 19 BC. After his consulship, Fabius served as proconsul of Asia; the exact period of his administration is uncertain, with some sources favouring 10 to 8 BC, and others as 6 to 5. During this time, he minted a number of coins bearing his image. In 3 BC, Fabius was legatus Augusti pro praetore or governor of Hispania Tarraconensis. While there, Paullus captured a Celtic city and named it Lucus Augusti, the modern city of Lugo.

During Fabius' administration of Asia, the provincial council decreed a competition to find a unique honour for the emperor. The winner was to receive a crown from the province. The proconsul himself submitted the winning proposal: a new calendar for the province, wherein the new year would start on September 23, Augustus' birthday.

He was honored with a monument built by some grateful colonists in his memory on the top of the sacred hill of Monte Giove, in the territory of Hatria Picena, where there was a sanctuary.

== Personal life ==
At some time between 20 and 10 BC, Fabius married Marcia, daughter of Lucius Marcius Philippus, consul suffectus in 38 BC. Her mother, Atia, was an aunt of Augustus, making Marcia the emperor's cousin. They had at least one son, Paullus Fabius Persicus, who was probably born in 2 or 1 BC. The younger Fabius was consul in AD 34, with Lucius Vitellius, father of the emperor Aulus Vitellius. The elder Fabius and Marcia may also have been the parents of Fabia Numantina, although she may have been the daughter of Paullus' brother, Africanus.

Fabius was a member of the Arval Brethren, an ancient college of priests that had dwindled into obscurity before Augustus chose to revive its importance as a means of demonstrating his piety and devotion to Roman traditions. Fabius was later succeeded in this priestly office by his son.

The poet Juvenal described Fabius as a generous patron of poetry. He was named in one of Horace's poems, written in 13 BC, and one of Horace's odes hints at him. Fabius was also the recipient of a wedding song composed by Ovid. While in exile Ovid wrote to Paullus, soliciting his help in allowing Ovid to return.

Writing many years later, the historian Tacitus reported that Fabius had accompanied the emperor on a secret visit to the emperor's last surviving grandson, Agrippa Postumus, in AD 13. Postumus had been exiled in AD 9, perhaps at the instigation of his stepmother, the empress Livia Drusilla. According to Tacitus, Augustus and his grandson were reconciled, although the latter was not recalled from exile before the emperor's death in AD 14. Supposedly, Fabius discussed the visit with his wife, who informed the empress. Tacitus reported that Fabius' death in the summer of AD 14 was said to be either directly or indirectly the result of Augustus' anger at this betrayal of trust. Ovid, too, suspected that his death might have been the result of Augustus' anger. However, both the truth and accuracy of this story have been questioned by modern historians.

== See also ==
- Fabia gens

== Footnotes ==
Political offices
Preceded by Gaius Caninius Rebilus, and Lucius Volusius Saturninus as suffect consuls	Consul of the Roman Empire; 11 BC with Quintus Aelius Tubero	Succeeded by Africanus Fabius Maximus, and Iullus Antonius as ordinary consuls
