= Gaius Valerius Severus =

Gaius Valerius Severus was a Roman senator of the second century. He was suffect consul in the nundinium of September to December 124 as the colleague of Gaius Julius Gallus. Severus is primarily known from inscriptions.

Severus is attested as proconsular governor of two public provinces, both prior to his consulate. The first province was Achaea, for the term 117/118. The second province was Lycia et Pamphylia, for a prolonged term from 120 to 122.

== Speculations ==
Due to the lack of information about Severus, experts have attempted to identify him with the subject of less well preserved inscriptions. For example, Ronald Syme noted that an inscription from Thubursicum concerning [...]rius Severus could detail an otherwise unknown portion of his career, which lists offices that include "Legate of Lycia-Pamphylia, consul, legate of one of the two Germanies, proconsul of Africa .... He clearly belongs to the period from Hadrian to Marcus inclusive. A priesthood, that of sodalis Hadrianalis, standing in the praetorian posts of his cursus along with XV vir s. f.." However, Syme admits that the first part of his name could be restored another way, such as [Elf]rius Severus, the name of two other attested men of this period. He also admits, "No need to add that there are a number of unattached Severi among the suffecti of the Antonine age."

A second proposed identification is by N. Lamboglia, who restored Severus' name in a fragmentary and mutilated inscription from Albenga. This would add the office of governor of Galatia and Cappadocia to his cursus honorum. However, in his discussion of Valerius Severus, Bernard Rémy demolishes the plausibility of this restoration.

Political offices
Preceded by Aulus Larcius Macedo, and Publius Ducenius Verres as consules suffecti	Suffect consul of the Roman Empire; 124 with Gaius Julius Gallus	Succeeded by Marcus Lollius Paulinus Decimus Valerius Asiaticus Saturninus II, and Lucius Titius Epidius Aquilinus as consules ordinarii
