= Lollius Bassus =

1st century AD Greek epigrammatist

Lollius Bassus (Ancient Greek: Λόλλιος Βάσσος) is the author of ten epigrams in the Greek Anthology. He is called, in the title of the second epigram, a native of Smyrna. His time is fixed by the tenth epigram, on the death of Germanicus, who died in 19 AD. He is perhaps the same Lollius to whom Horace wrote an Ode. It is also possible that he is the Lollius referred to by Chaucer. Lollius is the origin for Chaucer's story of Troilus.

== See also ==
- Lollia (gens)
