= Horti Lolliani =

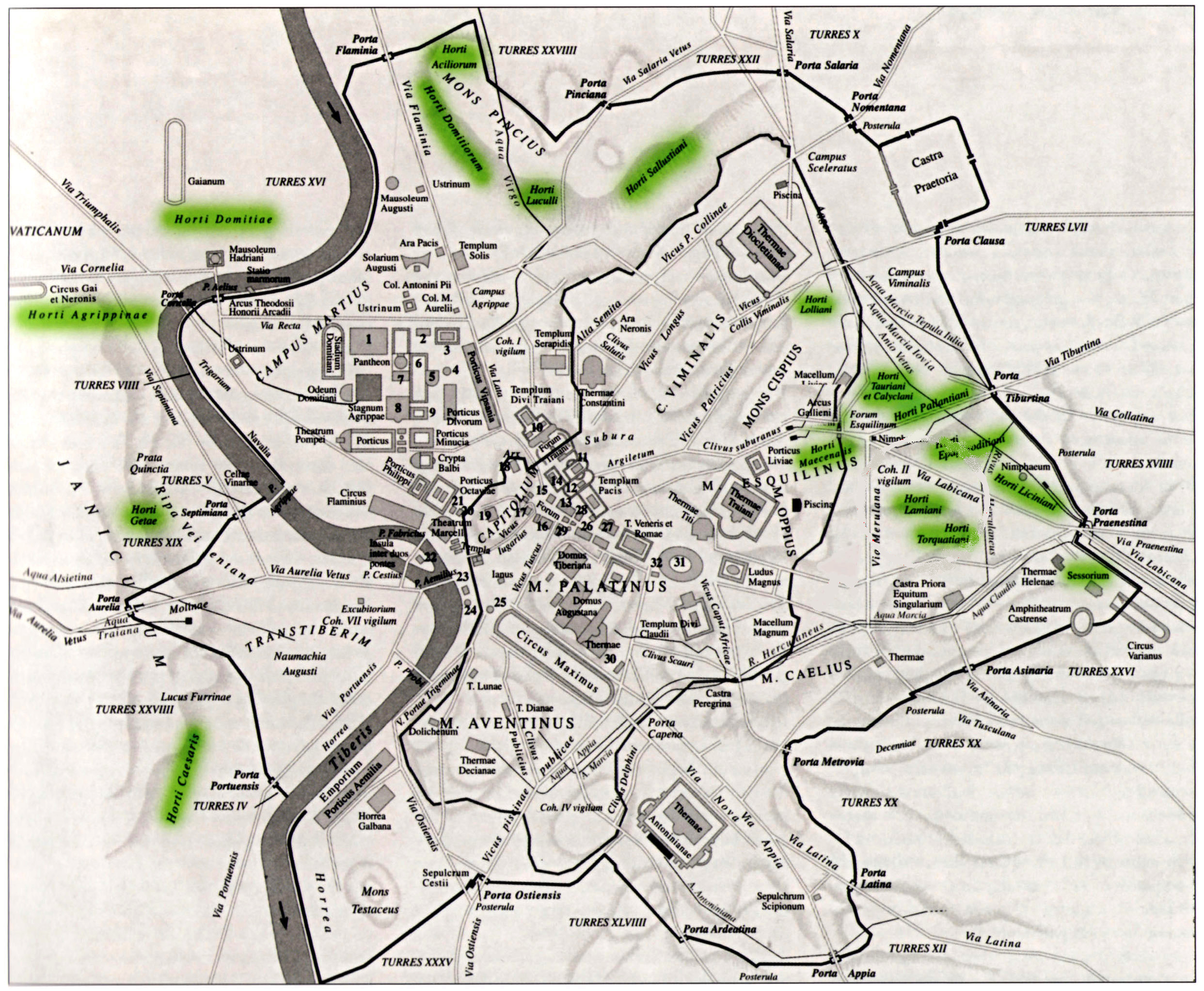
Horti of ancient Rome

The Horti Lolliani was a set of private gardens on the Esquiline Hill in ancient Rome, belonging to and named after Lollia Paulina, briefly the wife of Caligula.

After her divorce, Paulina was considered as a potential suitor to the new emperor Claudius and was seen as a rival to Agrippina the Younger. In AD 49, Agrippina accused Paulina of black magic, thus forcing her to leave Rome. The gardens and the rest of her property were seized by the empress.

In 1883, two cippi or boundary stones for the gardens were unearthed in the Villa Peretti and Piazza dei Cinquecento in front of the Roma Termini railway station. This indicates the gardens' approximate location.

== See also ==
- Roman gardens

== Bibliography ==
- F. Coarelli, Rome and environs - an archeological guide, Berkeley 2007. pp. 252.ISBN 9780520079618
- L. Richardson, jr, A New Topographical Dictionary of Ancient Rome, Baltimore - London 1992. pp. 199-200. ISBN 0801843006
