= Tiberius Claudius Nero (father of Tiberius Caesar) =

Politician and father of Roman emperor Tiberius

- Born: 1 April 85 BC
- Died: 33 BC
- Office: Praetor (42 BC)
- Spouse: Livia Drusilla
- Children: Tiberius (emperor) and Nero Claudius Drusus
- Father: Tiberius Claudius Nero

Tiberius Claudius Nero (1 April 85 BC – 33 BC) was a Roman politician, senator, praetor and legate of Pompey and then of the populares who lived in the 1st century BC.

He was notable for being the first husband of Livia Drusilla, before she divorced him to marry the future emperor Augustus, and for being the biological father of the second Roman emperor Tiberius.

== Ancestry ==
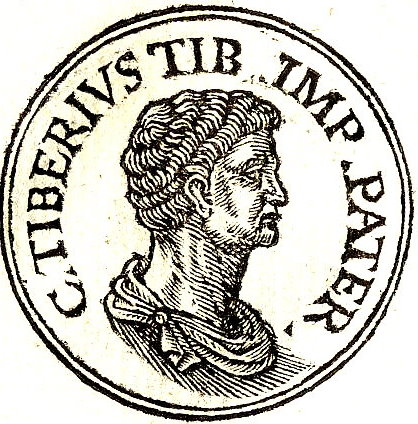
Fantasy portrait in the Promptuarii Iconum Insigniorum

Nero was a member of the republican Claudia gens of Rome. He was a descendant of the censor Appius Claudius Caecus. Nero was the son of Tiberius Claudius Nero. Nero had a sister named Claudia, who married the prefect Quintus Volusius.

== Life ==
Nero had served under Pompey the Great at the start of the civil war against Caesar, but soon surrendered and later served Julius Caesar as a quaestor in 48 BC, commanding a part of his fleet in the Alexandrian War. As a reward for his contribution, Nero was made pontiff. Julius Caesar also sent Nero to Gaul to create and monitor Roman colonies (Suetonius notes Narbo and Arelate).

Despite his service with Julius Caesar, Nero was an Optimate (supporter of the Senate) at heart who had initially served Pompey. After the murder of Julius Caesar on March 15, 44 BCE, Nero suggested that Caesar's assassins be rewarded for their services to the state, which went against the part of the Senate that wanted to persecute Caesar's assassins. Despite this suggestion, Nero was elected praetor in 43 BCE for 42 BCE.

Around the time Nero was elected praetor, he married his relative Livia Drusilla, (Note: Exactly how closely related Nero and Livia were is up for debate, some researchers have asserted with confidence that they were first cousins. This assumption generally includes believing that Suetonius was mistaken when referring to Livia's father as a Claudius Pulcher.) whose father Marcus Livius Drusus Claudianus was from the same gens. His son of the same name was born November 16, 42 BCE, in Fondi, Italy. Elaine Fantham believes it is likely that Nero had been married before he wed Livia, as he was looking for a wife in 50 BC when he approached Cicero to marry his daughter Tullia.

=== Second Triumvirate ===
Towards the end of Nero's praetorship, the Second Triumvirate began to break down, causing a dangerous situation in Rome as the triumvirs went to battle with each other. Because of this turmoil, Nero's praetorship was extended, and he was forced to choose sides. Due to his distrust of Octavian, he cast his lot with Mark Antony. In 41 BCE, he fled Campania, where he was in charge of the garrison, with Livia and Tiberius in tow, joining Antony's brother Lucius Antonius in Perusia. Perusia was besieged by Octavian's men by the time Nero arrived, and when the town fell in 40 BC, he was forced to flee first to Praeneste, and then Naples. In 40 BCE, Octavian and Mark Antony reconciled.

In Naples, Nero tried in vain to raise a slave battalion against Octavian and then asked for refuge with Sextus Pompey, who was then acting as a pirate leader in Sicily, but was denied. Nero, with his family, joined Mark Antony soon after in Achaea.

After three years of fleeing from Octavian, Nero returned to Rome with Livia and three-year-old Tiberius. Octavian, immediately after catching sight of Livia, fell in love with her, even though she was still married. Octavian was married to Scribonia, with whom he had a daughter named Julia, now known as Julia the Elder. Octavian and Scribonia divorced. At the time of Augustus's divorce, Livia was 6 months pregnant with Nero's second son. Nero was persuaded or forced by Octavian to divorce Livia. Octavian and Livia married on January 17, 38 BCE, waiving the traditional waiting period. Nero was present at their wedding, giving Livia away "just as a father would". Nero and Livia's second son was born in early 38 BCE, and he was named Decimus Claudius Drusus, which was later changed to Nero Claudius Drusus. After his birth, Octavian sent Drusus to Nero to raise him. Using a cognomen such as Nero as a first name was unusual, as was the prominence given to his maternal lineage in adopting Drusus as his cognomen.

== Death ==
Nero died in 33 BC, leaving Octavian as his son's guardian. Tiberius, aged 9, delivered his father's funeral eulogy on the Rostra in Rome. When the future Roman emperor Tiberius celebrated his coming of age, he staged two gladiatorial contests; one was held at the Forum in memory of his father and the other at the amphitheatre in memory of his grandfather Drusus.
