= Sosibius (disambiguation) =

Sosibius is the name of

- Sosibius, Egyptian politician of the 3rd century BC
- Sosibius of Tarentum, Egyptian soldier of the same era
- Sosibius, tutor of Britannicus executed on the orders of Agrippina
