= Aulus Gabinius Sisenna =

Ancient Roman soldier

Aulus Gabinius Sisenna, also known as Sisenna was a soldier who lived in the Roman Republic in the 1st century BC.

== Biography ==
Sisenna was born and raised in Rome being the son of the plebeian general, politician Aulus Gabinius from his wife Lollia from the gens Lollia, perhaps a daughter of Marcus Lollius Palicanus, tribune of the plebs in 71 BC.

Sisenna accompanied his father to Syria in 57 BC, when Gabinius served as a Proconsul in that province. Sisenna remained in Syria with a few troops, while Gabinius was involved in restoring the Egyptian Greek Pharaoh Ptolemy XII Auletes to his kingdom. When Gaius Memmius was exciting the people against Gabinius, Sisenna flung himself to the feet of Memmius for his father. Memmius treated Sisenna with indignity and was not softened by his supplicating posture. After this moment, no more is known on Sisenna.

== See also ==
- Sisenna
- List of Roman gentes

== Sources ==
- Gaius Suetonius Tranquillus, De Vita Caesarum, Caesar, 50
- article of Aulus Gabinius Sisenna at ancient library
- E. Goltz Huzar, Mark Anthony: A Biography, Routledge, 1978
