= Marcus Lollius =

Roman consul 21 BC, grandfather of empress Lollia Paulina

- Spouse: Aurelia
- Children: Marcus Lollius; Publius Lollius Maximus
- Father: Marcus Lollius

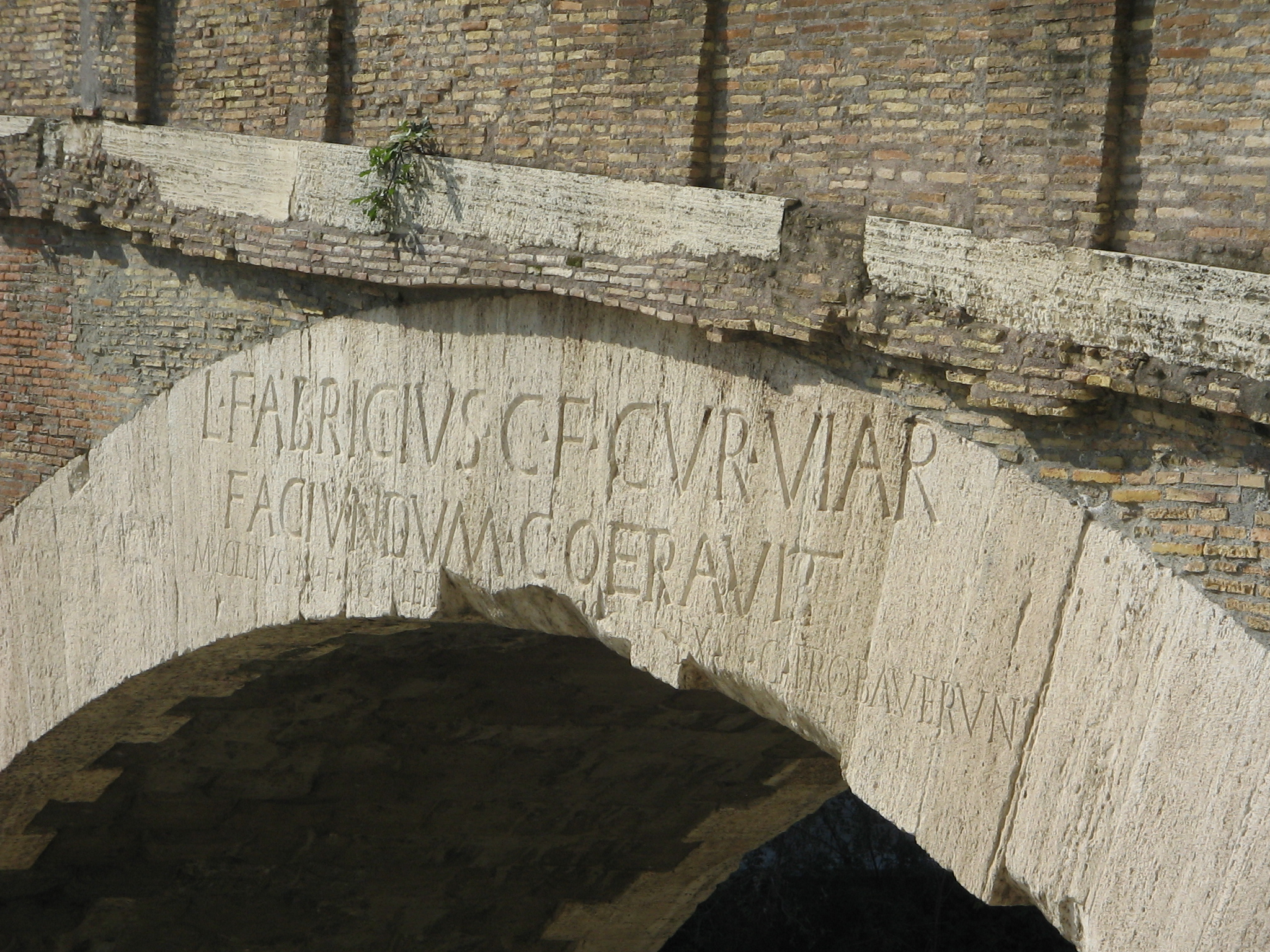
Pons Fabricius, with inscription

Marcus Lollius (c. 55 BC – after 2 BC) was a Roman politician, military officer and supporter of the first Roman emperor Augustus. His granddaughter Lollia Paulina would marry the emperor's great-grandson Caligula and become empress.

== Family background ==
Lollius was a member of the plebeian gens Lollia. His father was Marcus Lollius. Little is known of his family and early life. It is likely that he was a homo novus or a new man of politics in the late Roman Republic and early Imperial era.

== Early political career ==
Lollius has been assumed to be the "Marcus" referred to in Appian's Civil Wars. Appian recounts that Lollius was a legate of Marcus Junius Brutus, who after the Battle of Philippi in 42 BC had been proscribed. Lollius hid himself as a slave and was purchased by a "Barbula" (assumed to be Quintus Aemilius Lepidus), before his identity was revealed by a friend to Lepidus in Rome. Lepidus went to Marcus Vipsanius Agrippa who interceded on Lepidus' behalf with Octavian, who then ensured that the name of Lollius was removed from the proscription lists.

Lollius fought in the Battle of Actium in 31 BC, where Lollius interceded before Octavian on behalf of Lepidus, who had been captured while fighting for Mark Antony. As Lollius joined Octavian and as upward Roman mobility depended on patronage, there is a possibility that Lollius and Augustus were close friends before Augustus had eliminated his rivals.

== Roman governor of Galatia ==
Lollius either served in a political position as a quaestor, aedile, tribune or praetor before being appointed by Augustus as a provincial governor. His first known office was his governorship of Galatia in Anatolia in 25 BC. For Augustus to appoint him as a governor, Lollius must have proven himself to be a capable politician. Lollius was the first Roman governor of Galatia. Galatia was previously ruled as a kingdom, and their last king, Amyntas, had died. Thereafter, Augustus sent Lollius to Galatia to serve as its governor and to integrate Galatia into the Empire, an important task.

Although the mission was difficult and opposed by the local population, Lollius proved himself to be a successful governor there. He was able to train Amyntas' army and incorporate them into the Roman army, with the Galatian Legion becoming a part of the Legio XXII Deiotariana. He also founded a Roman colony in Galatia which showcased Roman civilization, all without causing any violence to erupt in the province.

== Consulship ==
When Lollius' time as governor had finished, he returned to Rome and was elected consul in 21 BC. He served his consulship alongside his old friend Quintus Aemilius Lepidus. His consulship is mentioned in an inscription which he dedicated to himself and Lepidus during that year. The inscription is located on the eastern arch of the southern face of the Pons Fabricius in Rome.

The inscription reads, in Latin:

M LOLLIVS M F Q LEPI[dus m f c]OS EX S C PROBAVERVNT

"Marcus Lollius, son of Marcus, and Quintus Lepidus, son of Marcus,
"Consuls, approved this in accordance with a decree of the Senate."

Lollius and Lepidus had dedicated this inscription as repairs were carried out to the bridge. We know about his consulship from the inscription, that can be seen here.. Another inscription found near Torino is mentioning Lollius as consul "sine collega". Lollius was the first person from the gens Lollia to obtain a consulship.

== Remaining political career ==
In 19/18 BC, Augustus appointed Lollius as a Roman governor again, this time to the province of Macedonia. During his governorship, Lollius defeated a Thracian tribe called the Bersi, as known from a fragmentary inscription found in Philippi, Greece.

In 17/16 BC Lollius was appointed by Augustus as governor of Gaul. During his governorship, he was responsible for several legions who guarded the Rhine river. His legions were defeated by the Germanic tribes—the Sicambri, Tencteri and Usipetes—that had crossed the Rhine. The military defeat that Lollius suffered, known as the clades Lolliana, is coupled by Suetonius with the disaster of Publius Quinctilius Varus, Suetonius called it disgraceful rather than dangerous. In 15 BC Augustus dispatched his step-son Tiberius to rectify the situation and to regain the captured standard of the Legio V Macedonica. On the arrival of Tiberius, the Germanic tribes retired beyond the Rhine. The Romans then proceeded to conquer Rhetia and the Alpine region. Although the political and military career of Lollius suffered, and he was never again given command of an army, he remained on friendly terms with Augustus.

The Horrea Lolliana was either built by Lollius or his son of the same name. It is known from the inscriptions that refer to them, and also from their plan in the Severan Marble Plan of Rome. It seems that the family of Lollius had extensive trade connections, and his family's name is found among the Italian merchants on the Greek island of Delos in the Hellenistic period.

Lollius in 2/1 BC was appointed by Augustus as a tutor to his adopted son and grandson Gaius Caesar on his mission to the Roman East and to learn about government. Among the officers who escorted them were the historian Marcus Velleius Paterculus, Roman Senator Publius Sulpicius Quirinius, and the future Praetorian prefect Lucius Aelius Sejanus.

When all the men arrived in the Roman East, embassies were sent to Lollius, instead of Gaius Caesar, whom they completely ignored. Lollius' relations with Gaius Caesar started to deteriorate when they visited Tiberius, who was living in voluntary exile on the Greek island of Rhodes. Lollius had poisoned Gaius Caesar's mind against Tiberius, whom Lollius had hated since 16 BC. Gaius Caesar seems to have insulted his uncle Tiberius, and Lollius was held responsible for the incident.

As Lollius and Gaius Caesar continued their tour of the Roman East, they started to quarrel. Lollius fell out of favor with Gaius Caesar, as he was accused of receiving bribes from the Parthian King, Phraates. As Gaius Caesar denounced Lollius to Augustus, Lollius, depending on the source, either poisoned himself or committed suicide in an unspecified manner to avoid punishment, or else died from natural causes.

== Reputation ==
Lollius amassed a huge fortune that he plundered from the provinces that he ruled. The historian Pliny the Elder describes him unfavourably, calling him a hypocrite who cared for nothing but amassing wealth. Marcus Velleius Paterculus describes him as greedy and corrupt, as Paterculus was a partisan of Tiberius.

Despite his unfavorable reputation among some, Lollius was favored by others. Lollius was a personal friend of the poet Horace. Horace called Lollius a reliable man and praised the fact that he was above avarice, the usual sin of Roman governors. Horace dedicates Ode 4.9, 34-44 to Lollius, addressing him with ambiguous praise. Some years after the death of Lollius, Tiberius criticized him in the Roman Senate. The huge fortune that Lollius had was later inherited by his granddaughter Lollia Paulina.

== Family and issue ==
Lollius married a noblewoman called Aurelia, a sister-in-law of the literary patron and consul Marcus Valerius Messalla Corvinus who had married her sister. Messalla's son was later adopted by his mother and aunt's father and renamed Marcus Aurelius Cotta Maximus Messalinus. Tacitus (Annals XII.22) states Marcus Aurelius Cotta Maximus Messalinus was great-uncle to Lollia Paulina.

Aurelia bore Lollius the following children:

- Son, Marcus Lollius
- Possible son, Publius Lollius Maximus, who was also known as Lollius Maximus

== Archaeological evidence ==
Between 2005 and 2006, professors and archaeologists from the University of Cologne, Germany, and the Katholieke Universiteit Leuven, Belgium, participated in archaeological studies and restorations of Roman antiquities in Sagalassos, Turkey. Among their various finds was an inscribed cylindrical base for a colossal statue representing Lollius. On the statue base there is an honorific Greek inscription stating, "Marcus Lollius is honored by the demos [people of Sagalassos] as their patronus [patron]." This means Lollius must have brought privileges to the city, perhaps such as intervention in the extension of its territory, solving territorial disputes with neighboring cities or estates, or special contacts with the emperor.

Another pair of finds connected with the statue base found at Sagalassos are two foot fragments that may have belonged to a colossal statue of Lollius from the reign of Augustus. The ancient boots, which are identified as "lion boots" or mulleus, were embroidered, buckled on the outside and strapped in the inside. These boots were made from leather, in particular from cat skin. These boots symbolized power and were considered royal footwear. These items found are possibly dated to about 1 BC, when Lollius and Gaius Caesar visited the Roman East. As Gaius Caesar at this time was honored in many cities, it seems that Lollius was also an honored personality in this region. The original monument of Lollius was ca. 5 meters tall, and his statue was placed in one of the most important locations in Sagalassos. The remains of Lollius' statue are now on display at Burdur Museum in Turkey.

== Sources ==
- Appian, Civil Wars
- This article incorporates text from a publication now in the public domain: Chisholm, Hugh, ed. (1911). "Lollius, Marcus". Encyclopædia Britannica (11th ed.). Cambridge University Press. This work in turn cites:
  - Suetonius, Augustus - 23, Tiberius – 12
  - Marcus Velleius Paterculus ii. 97, 102
  - Tacitus, Annals, i. 10, iii. 48
  - Pliny, Nat. Hist. ix. 35 (58)
  - Cassius Dio, liv. 6.
- Lollia Gens article at ancient library
- Marcus Lollius no. 5 article at ancient library
- Horace - Edited by O.A.W Dilke, Horace: Epistles Book I, Taylor & Francis
- D. Ferry & Q.H. Flaccus, The Epistles of Horace Book I, CUP Archive, 1937
- Broughton, T. Robert S, The Magistrates of the Roman Republic, Vol II, 1952
- G. Rickman, Roman Granaries and Store Buildings, CUP Archive, 1971
- C. Skidmore, Practical Ethics for Roman Gentlemen: The Works of Valerius Maximus, University of Exeter Press, 1996
- J. Hazel, Who's Who in the Roman World, Routledge, 2001
- T. Lansford, The Latin Inscriptions of Rome: A Walking Guide, JHU Press, 2009
- H. Furneaux & H. Pitman, Cornelii Taciti Annalium, Libri V, VI, XI, XII: With Introduction and Notes Abridged from the Larger Work, Cambridge University Press, 2010
- Velleius Paterculus – Translated with Introduction and Notes by J.C. Yardley & A.A. Barrett, The Roman History, Hackett Publishing, 2011
- Marcus Lollius at Livius.org Marcus Lollius’ article at Livius.org Archived 2013-10-30 at the Wayback Machine
- Archaeology’s Interactive Dig – Interactive Dig Sagalassos – Sculptural Studies Report 1: 2006, by Marc Waelkens
- Archaeology’s Interactive Dig – Interactive Dig Sagalassos – Recording Report 3: Epigraphical Studies, 2006, by Marc Waelkens

Political offices
Preceded by Marcus Claudius Marcellus Aeserninus, and Lucius Arruntius	Consul of the Roman Empire; 21 BC with Quintus Aemilius Lepidus	Succeeded by Marcus Appuleius, and Publius Silius Nerva
