= Decimus Valerius Asiaticus =

Roman consul in 35 and 46 AD

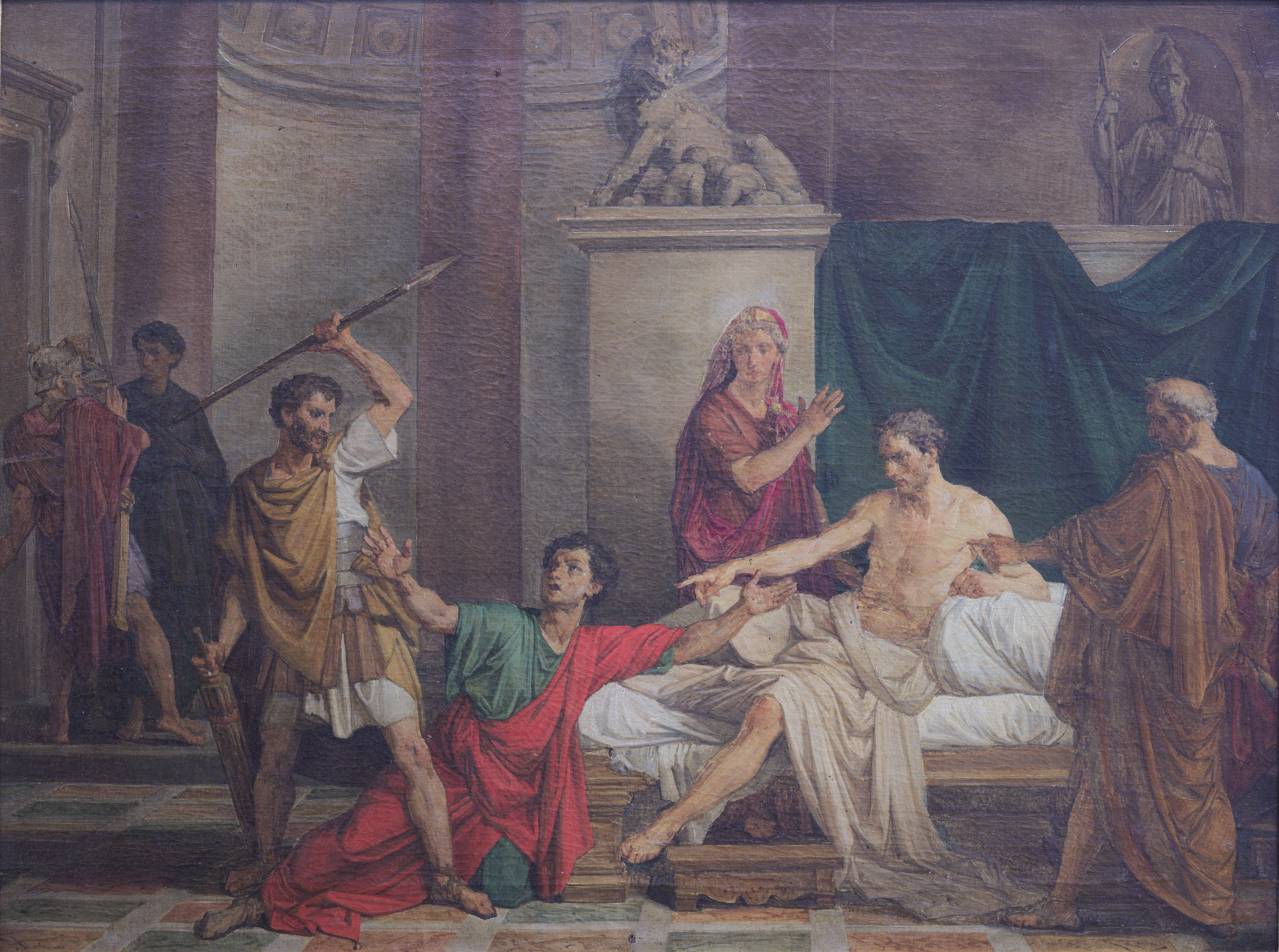
- Emperor Claudius has Asiaticus assassinated

Consul of the Roman Empire
- In office 35
- Co-consul: Aulus Gabinius Secundus
- Emperor: Tiberius
- In office 46
- Co-consul: Marcus Junius Silanus
- Emperor: Claudius

Personal details
- Born: c. 5 BC Vienna, Gallia Narbonensis, Roman Empire
- Died: 47 AD Rome, Roman Empire
- Citizenship: Roman
- Spouse: Lollia Saturnina (disputed)
- Children: Decimus Valerius Asiaticus
- Occupation: Politician; commander

Military service
- Allegiance: Roman Empire
- Branch/service: Roman army
- Battles/wars: Roman conquest of Britain

Decimus Valerius Asiaticus (around 5 BC – 47 AD, Greek: Δέκιμος Οὐαλέριος Ἀσιατικός) was a prominent Roman senator of provincial origin. Asiaticus was twice consul: first in 35 as suffect consul with Aulus Gabinius Secundus as his colleague; second in 46 as ordinary consul with Marcus Junius Silanus as his colleague. He was the first man from Gaul to be admitted into the Roman Senate, as well as the first man from Gaul to attain the consulship.

== Family background and early life ==
Information about his family is incomplete. Asiaticus was of Allobrogian origin; in the words of Ronald Syme, "of native dynastic stock." An ancestor of Asiaticus received Roman citizenship from Gaius Valerius Flaccus who was the Governor of Transalpine Gaul in 80 BC and seems to have inherited Flaccus’ nomen. The names of either of his parents are not known; Asiaticus had a brother, but his name is not known.

Asiaticus was born in Vienne, Isère in Gallia Narbonensis. At a young age he may have been sent to Rome to make a career. He was a cultivated man, renowned for his athleticism and he became close to the Julio-Claudian dynasty. He regularly attended the house of Antonia Minor, the mother of Emperor Claudius and grandmother of the emperor Caligula.

== Political career ==
Many of the details of his career are not known, beyond the fact that Asiaticus was a close friend of the imperial house. He acceded to his first consulship during the reign of Tiberius, an office he could only have achieved with the acquiescence, if not the act, of the emperor. Tiberius' successor Caligula was also a friend to Asiaticus, and may have granted him estates in Egypt. Despite this, there were drawbacks in this relationship. Caligula confessed to committing adultery with Asiaticus' wife at a public drinking bout by complaining in front of Asiaticus about her performance in bed. Clearly offended and insulted, he developed a hatred of Caligula.

Despite this, Asiaticus was invited to sit with Caligula on 24 January 41 at the theatre an hour prior to his assassination. When news of the deed swept through Rome and the identity of the slayers was not yet known, based on Caligula's insult to him, Asiaticus was accused of participating in Caligula's death; he replied, "I wish I had been the man." Nevertheless, some modern historians suspect Asiaticus was an accomplice in Caligula's murder. However, Michael Swan has pointed out several reasons not to suspect he was a party to the act, such as Asiaticus' own denial. One point Swan raises is that after Caligula's death, when Asiaticus offered his name to the Senate to succeed Caligula, his candidacy was opposed by one of the known participants in the assassination, Lucius Annius Vinicianus.

Whether or not Asiaticus was involved in Caligula's death, contemporaries such as Sosibius suspected he was involved. This was doubtlessly the basis for Claudius' antipathy towards Asiaticus. Although Asiaticus accompanied Claudius in 43 on his campaign in Britain, it was arguably because Claudius mistrusted him and wanted Asiaticus where he could keep an eye on him. In a speech to the Senate, where Claudius defended the adlection of Gaulish men into the Senate, he obliquely disparaged Asiaticus, refusing to mention his name:

ut dírum nomen latronis taceam et odi illud palaestricum pródigium quod ante in domum consulatum intulit quam colonia sua solidum cívitatis romanae benificium cónsecuta est

— not to mention the vile name of that brigand, that portent of hate from the wrestling school, who brought home the rank of consul before his colony acquired the full benefit of Roman citizenship.

== Purchase of the Gardens of Lucullus and downfall ==
Sometime after his second consulship, as Asiaticus was a well-connected man of immense wealth, he had used some of his fortune to acquire and to redevelop one of Rome's most magnificent private properties, the pleasure gardens of Lucius Licinius Lucullus, a famous general, politician and glutton of the 1st century BC. In 47, the notorious Senator Publius Suillius Rufus, brought capital charges against Asiaticus before the Senate. Among those charges was adultery with Poppaea Sabina the Elder, mother of the empress Poppaea Sabina.

The charges brought against Asiaticus were the result of a convoluted sexual conspiracy plotted by Claudius’ third wife, the empress Valeria Messalina, so she could seize Asiaticus’ gardens. Through the connivance of Messalina, Claudius condemned Asiaticus to death. Although Asiaticus enjoyed the public's favour, he could not easily be seen as a threat to Claudius or Messalina. Asiaticus went to his death calmly, making arrangements for his funeral. He committed suicide by opening his veins, but not till he had inspected his funeral pyre, and directed its removal to another spot, lest the smoke should hurt the thick foliage of the trees. Asiaticus was survived by his wife and his son.

== Descendants ==
Some historians have concluded that Asiaticus married Lollia Saturnina, a woman surmised was the sister of Lollia Paulina, the third wife of the emperor Caligula. However, Bernard Kavanagh has argued not only that it is more likely that Saturnina was not Asiaticus' wife, but the wife of his son, but also that, as a consequence, Lollia Saturnina was likely the niece of Lollia Paulina.

Regardless of the identity of his wife, an inscription found at Tibur provides information about the identity of his son, Decimus Valerius Asiaticus, and grandson, Marcus Lollius Paulinus Decimus Valerius Asiaticus Saturninus. It is possible that Asiaticus had other children.

== Land, property and benefactions ==
Asiaticus invested the major part of his money in real property. According to inscriptional evidence, he owned properties in Gaul, Egypt, and Italy. We know he specifically owned estates in the Egyptian towns of Euhemeria and Philadelphia.

Within three years of his death, Asiaticus' properties were confiscated by the state.

In Vienne, Asiaticus and his brother financed construction designed to beautify the city. An inscription found in North Vienne marks the tomb of the Scaenici Asiaticiani, a comedy troupe which owed its existence to a certain Asiaticus, perhaps Decimus Valerius Asiaticus or his father. According to another inscription, one of the freedmen of Asiaticus was known to have become a very wealthy man, and probably owned properties in Lugdunum.

== See also ==
- Lyon Tablet

== Sources ==
- Tacitus, The Annals of Imperial Rome
- Suetonius, The Twelve Caesars, Claudius
- Seneca the Younger, De Constantia sapientis
- T.P. Wiseman, Talking to Virgil: A Miscellany, University of Exeter Press, 1992
- R. Alston, Aspects of Roman History AD 14-117, Routledge, 2002
- A. Freisenbruch, The First Ladies of Rome: The Women Behind the Caesars (Google eBook), Random House, 2011
- Decimus Valerius Asiaticus, Un Notable Gallo-Romain de Vienna au Ier Siecle Apres JC (Internet Archive copy; original page unavailable) "Decimus Valerius Asiaticus: A notable Gallo-Roman from Vienna in the 1st century" (in French)
- The Roman World: Gallia Narbonensis's Urbs of Vienna

Political offices
Preceded by Gaius Cestius Gallus, and Marcus Servilius Nonianus as Ordinary consuls	Suffect consul of the Roman Empire; 35 with Aulus Gabinius Secundus	Succeeded by Sextus Papinius Allenius, and Quintus Plautius as Ordinary consuls
Preceded by Aulus Antonius Rufus, and Marcus Pompeius Silvanus Staberius Flavianus as Suffect consuls	Consul of the Roman Empire; 46 with Marcus Junius Silanus Torquatus	Succeeded by Camerinus Antistius Vetus as Suffect consul
