= Tiberius Claudius Nero (grandfather of Tiberius Caesar) =

Roman senator

- Office: Triumvir monetalis (79 BC); Praetor (c. 67 BC)
- Children: Tiberius Claudius Nero and Claudia

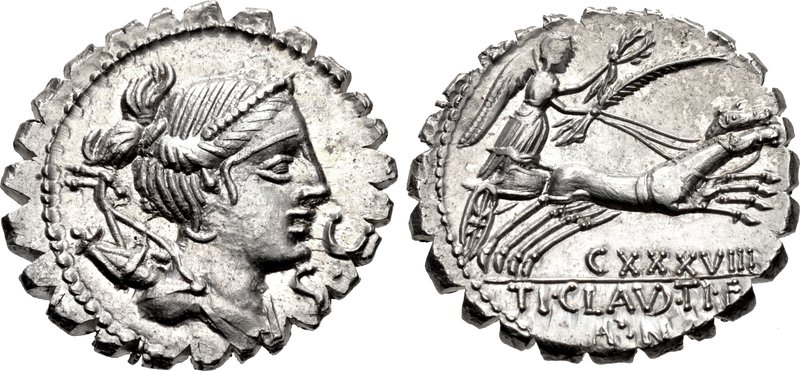
Denarius minted by Tiberius Claudius Nero in 79 BC. The obverse depicts Diana, while the reverse shows Victory driving a biga.

Tiberius Claudius Nero (fl. 79–63 BC) was a Roman senator and military officer. He was grandfather of the emperor Tiberius.

== Biography ==
He possibly studied under Demetrius Lacon, who may have dedicated one or two books to Nero. It is also possible that the man who was friends with Lacon was his father.

Tiberius served as triumvir of the mint (triumvir monetalis) in 79 BC. He minted denarii with a bust of Diana and a chariot driven by Victory. Some numismatists have explained the presence of Diana as an allusion to the Sabine origin of the gens Claudia, but Michael Crawford dismisses this theory, which comes from a mistake of Varro.

Tiberius was praetor at an undetermined date in the 60s, at least before 63, and perhaps before 67, when he was given a command in the expedition of Pompey against the Cilician Pirates.

Tiberius was famous for recommending that the members of the Catiline Conspiracy be confined.

Tiberius with his wife had a son called Tiberius Claudius Nero (c. 85-33 BC) and a daughter called Claudia who married the prefect, Quintus Volusius.

== Bibliography ==
- T. Robert S. Broughton, The Magistrates of the Roman Republic, American Philological Association, 1951–1952.
- Michael Crawford, Roman Republican Coinage, Cambridge University Press, 1974.
- Münzer, Friedrich (1899), "Claudius 253", Realencyclopädie der classischen Altertumswissenschaft (RE, PW), volume 3, part 2, column 2777.
