= Aulus Gabinius =

Roman politician and general (101–47 BC)

- Born: before 101 BC
- Died: 48 or 47 BC; Salona
- Office: Tribune of the plebs (67 BC); Consul (58 BC); Proconsul (Syria; 57–54 BC); Legate (under Caesar; 48–47 BC)

Aulus Gabinius (before 101 BC – 48 or 47 BC) was a politician and general of the Roman Republic. He had an important career, culminating with a consulship in 58 BC, mainly thanks to the patronage of Pompey. His name is mostly associated with the lex Gabinia, a law he passed as tribune of the plebs in 67 BC that granted Pompey an extraordinary command in the Mediterranean Sea to fight the pirates.

== Career ==
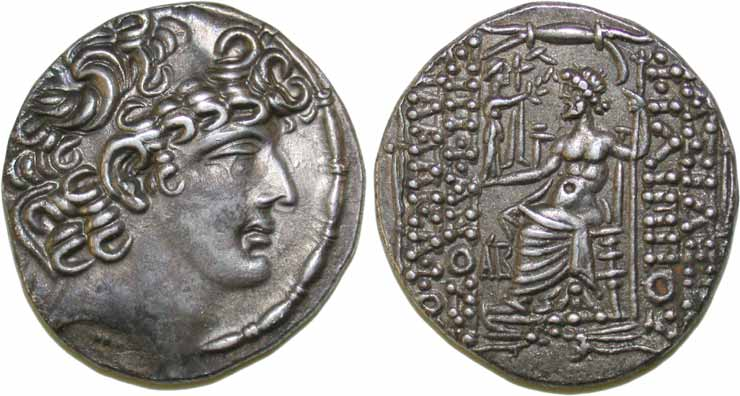
Coin issued under Gabinius in Syria

In 67 BC, as a tribune of the plebs, Gabinius brought forward the law (Lex Gabinia), which gave Pompey the command in the war against Mediterranean pirates, with extensive powers that gave him absolute control over the sea and the coasts for 50 miles inland. Through Gabinius' two other measures, loans of money to foreign ambassadors in Rome were made actionable (as a check on the corruption of the Senate), and the Senate was ordered to give audiences to foreign envoys on certain fixed days (February 1–March 1) each year.

From 66–62 BC, during the final phases of the Third Mithridatic War, Gabinius served Pompey as a legate. In 65 BC Pompey gave him command of a part of his army and sent him into Northern Mesopotamia to pressure the Parthian king, Phraates III, into a treaty with Pompey. From Northern Mesopotamia, Gabinius marched into Syria to help rid the region of pirates and brigands. Aristobulus, brother of the high priest and king of Judea, Hyrcanus II, bribed him to support his [Aristobulus] claim to the Judean throne. When Pompey arrived in Antioch, in Syria, Aristobulus sent an official deputation, fearing the fortune he had spent to persuade Pompey's legates might be wasted; he accused Gabinius and Scaurus of accepting bribes. It is unknown if Pompey did anything with these accusations.

In 61 BC, as praetor, tried to win public favour by providing games on a scale of unusual splendour. In 59 BC, Gabinius ran for one of the consulships for 58 and managed to get himself elected, although not without the suspicion of bribery. He was elected consul alongside Lucius Calpurnius Piso Caesoninus, Caesar's father-in-law. During his term of office he aided Publius Clodius Pulcher in bringing about the exile of Marcus Tullius Cicero. Gabinius also managed to secure Syria as his proconsular province.

In 57 BC Gabinius started his term as governor of Syria. Shortly after his arrival he marched his army south into Judaea, defeated the army of Alexander, Hyrcanus II's nephew, in a battle near Jerusalem, and reinstated Hyrcanus II as high-priest of Jerusalem, He suppressed revolts, introduced important changes in the government of Judaea and rebuilt several towns. He also supported Mithridates IV in his struggle against his brother Orodes but abandoned Mithridates when the more lucrative offer of restoring Ptolemy XII Auletes to the Egyptian throne reached him.

In 55 BC Pompey convinced Gabinius to march to Egypt to restore Ptolemy XII to his throne. Gabinius did so without the consent of the Senate. He succeeded after a short successful campaign, in which he was supported by the young cavalry officer Mark Antony. He left some of his troops, the so-called Gabiniani, in Egypt to protect Ptolemy XII. These Gabiniani fought against rebellious subjects of the king and later, after the king's death, against Gaius Julius Caesar.

During Gabinius's time in Egypt, Syria had been devastated by robbers, and Alexander, son of Aristobulus, had again taken up arms with the object of depriving Hyrcanus II of the high-priesthood. Gabinius marched into Judea and defeated Alexander near Mount Tabor killing 10,000 of Alexander's men. With some difficulty Gabinius restored order in Syria, and in 54 BC handed over the province to his successor, Marcus Licinius Crassus. The Roman equites (knights), who as tax collectors had suffered heavy losses during the disturbances in Syria, were greatly embittered against Gabinius, and, when he appeared in the Senate to give an account of his governorship, he was brought to trial on three counts, all involving a capital offence.

On the charge of maiestas (high treason) incurred by having left his province for Egypt without the consent of the Senate and in defiance of the Sibylline Books, Gabinius was acquitted. It was said that the judges were bribed, and even Cicero, an enemy of Gabinius, was persuaded by Pompey to say as little as he could. On the second charge, that of repetundae (extortion during the administration of his province), with special reference to the 10,000 talents paid by Ptolemy XII for his restoration, he was found guilty, in spite of evidence offered on his behalf by Pompey and witnesses from Alexandria and the eloquence of Cicero, who had been induced to plead his cause. Nothing but Cicero's wish to do a favour to Pompey could have induced him to take on the task. Commentators hint that the half-heartedness of Cicero's defence contributed to Gabinius's condemnation. The third charge, that of ambitus (illegalities committed during his canvassing for the consulship), was consequently dropped. Gabinius went into exile and his property was confiscated.

After the outbreak of Civil War in 49 BC, Gabinius was recalled by Gaius Julius Caesar and entered his service, but took no active part against his old patron, Pompey. After the Battle of Pharsalus, he was commissioned to transport some recently levied troops to Illyricum. On his way overland, he was attacked by the Dalmatians and with difficulty made his way to Salona. There Gabinius defended himself against the attacks of the Pompeian commander, Marcus Octavius, but a few months later died of illness (48 BC or the beginning of 47 BC).

== Marriage and children ==
Gabinius married a Roman noblewoman called Lollia from the Lollia gens, perhaps a daughter of Marcus Lollius Palicanus, tribune of the plebs in 71 BC. He adopted a son from the gens Cornelia called Aulus Gabinius Sisenna.

== Bibliography ==
=== Modern sources ===
- Broughton, Thomas Robert Shannon (1952). The magistrates of the Roman republic. Vol. 2. New York: American Philological Association.
- Giuseppe Stocchi, Aulo Gabinio e i suoi processi (1892)
- Zmeskal, Klaus (2009). Adfinitas (in German). Vol. 1. Passau: Verlag Karl Stutz. ISBN 978-3-88849-304-1.

=== Ancient sources ===
- Cassius Dio xxxvi. 23–36, xxxviii. 13. 30, xxxix. 55-63
- Plutarch, Pompey, 25. 48
- Josephus, Antiq. xiv. 4-6
- Appian, Illyrica, 12, Bell. Civ. ii. 24. 59
- Cicero, ad Atti. vi. 2, ad Q. Fratrem, ii. 13, Post reditum in senatu, 4–8, Pro lege Manilia, 17, 18, 19

Political offices
Preceded by Gaius Julius Caesar; Marcus Calpurnius Bibulus	Roman consul 58 BC; With: Lucius Calpurnius Piso Caesoninus	Succeeded by P. Cornelius Lentulus Spinther; Q. Caecilius Metellus Nepos
Preceded by Gn. Cornelius Lentulus Marcellinus	Governor of Syria; 57–54 BC	Succeeded by Marcus Licinius Crassus
