= Lucius Volusius Saturninus (consul 12 BC) =

Roman senator, proconsular governor of Africa and governor of Syria

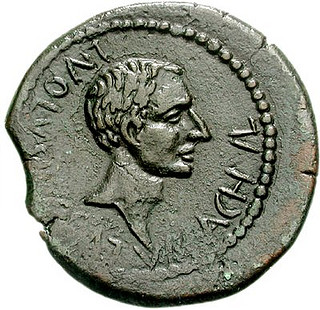
- Dupondius from Acholla with the head of Volusius, and the text "VOLVSIVS SATVR ACHVL"
- Died: 20 AD
- Spouse: Nonia Polla
- Children: Volusia Saturnina; Lucius Volusius Saturninus
- Parents: Quintus Volusius (father); Claudia (mother)

Lucius Volusius Saturninus, also known as Lucius Volusius (died AD 20), was a Roman Senator from the powerful plebeian Volusia gens, or family. He was a cousin of emperor Tiberius.

== Biography ==
=== Early life ===
Volusius came from an ancient and distinguished Senatorial family, that according to Tacitus (56–120) had never risen above the praetorship until then. His father was Quintus Volusius a prefect who served under Cicero in 51 BC to 50 BC in Cilicia and was a pupil of his in oratory. His mother was Claudia, aunt of the future Roman emperor Tiberius. He had a sister named Volusia Saturnina.

=== Career ===
Volusius was a homo novus, the first member of his family to serve as a suffect consul in 12 BC, replacing Publius Sulpicius Quirinius. According to Tacitus, he held censorial functions for the selection of equestrians as members of the judicature, and became the first person in his family to amass wealth, for which his family became greatly conspicuous.

Following his consulship, Volusius was admitted to the septemviri epulonum. Several years later he served as proconsular governor of Africa for 7/6 BC, as attested by coins of Acholla and Hadrumetum. From AD 4 to 5, Volusius served as a Roman Governor of Syria. Based on inscriptional evidence, the Horrea Volusiana was either built by Volusius or his grandson Quintus Volusius Saturninus, consul in 56.

== Family ==
Volusius married Nonia Polla, the daughter of Lucius Nonius Asprenas, consul of 36 BC. Polla bore Volusius a son, Lucius Volusius Saturninus, suffect consul in AD 3, and a daughter Volusia Saturnina. Some older authorities claim that Volusius and Nonia Polla had another daughter, Volusia Cornelia, but Rudolf Hanslik has shown she was the daughter of another Voluisus Saturninus, the consul of the year 92.

== Sources ==
- Tacitus, Annales
- Quintus Volusius no.2 article at ancient library
- Prosopographia Imperii Romani Saec I, Berlin, 1897–1898, V 660.
- G. Rickman, Roman Granaries and Store Buildings, CUP Archive, 1971
- B.E. Thomasson, Fasti Africani, Senatorische und ritterliche Ämter in den römischen Provinzen Nordafrikas von Augustus bis Diokletian, Paul Aströms Förlag, 1996

Political offices
Preceded by Publius Sulpicius Quirinius as Ordinary consul	Suffect Consul of the Roman Empire; 12 BC with Gaius Caninius Rebilus	Succeeded by Quintus Aelius Tubero, and Paullus Fabius Maximus as Ordinary consuls
