= Quintus Volusius (prefect) =

- Spouse: Claudia
- Children: Lucius Volusius Saturninus; Volusia Saturnina

Quintus Volusius also known as Quintus Volusius Saturninus was a senator of the Roman Republic who lived in the 1st century BC.

== Biography ==
He was originally from the city of Feronia, also known as Lucus Feroniae in Etruria. He came from an ancient and distinguished Senatorial family, that never rose above the Praetorship.

Volusius was a pupil of the Roman statesman Cicero in oratory. He accompanied Cicero to Cilicia, where he held office under him. While in Cilicia, Volusius served as a Prefect under Cicero in 51 BC to 50 BC.

During his Prefectship in Cilicia, Cicero sent to Volusius to Cyprus. When Volusius arrived on the island, he had heard and settled civil cases to a small group of Roman citizens who lived on the island. Cicero describes Volusius as a 'man both trustworthy and extraordinarily moderate'.

Volusius married Claudia, the daughter of Pompey's officer, Tiberius Claudius Nero, and aunt of the future Roman emperor Tiberius. Claudia bore Volusius one son, Lucius Volusius Saturninus and a daughter, Volusia Saturnina.

== In fiction ==
Volusius is a character in the novel titled Respublica: A Novel of Cicero's Roman Republic written by Richard Braccia, which was released by AuthorHouse in 2009.

== Sources ==
- Tacitus, Annales
- Quintus Volusius no.2 article at ancient library
- Romeins Imperium – Lucius Quintus Volusius Saturninus translated from Dutch to English
- Jonathan Zarecki, "The Cypriot Exemption from Evocatio and the Character of Cicero’s Proconsulship", Greece & Rome, 59 (2012), pp. 46–55
