= Marcus Aurelius Cotta Maximus Messalinus =

Roman Senator and consul who was a friend of the Roman emperors Augustus and Tiberius

Marcus Aurelius Cotta Maximus Messalinus (flourished second half of 1st century BC and first half of 1st century AD) was a Roman Senator who was a friend of the first two Roman emperors Augustus and Tiberius.

== Family background ==
Maximus was born and raised in Rome. His birth date is unknown; however, it is not earlier than 24 BC, and possibly in 14 BC. His father was the literary patron Marcus Valerius Messalla Corvinus, suffect consul in 31 BC. Maximus was the son born to Corvinus’ second marriage to his unknown wife. The last poem of the poet Ovid (Ex Ponto IV.16) reveals that his mother was a Roman noblewoman called Aurelia Cotta. Further evidence that Aurelia Cotta was his mother was that, although he was born into the gens Valeria, he was later adopted into the Aurelii Cottae.

His birth name is unknown, and so he is only known by his adopted name. From his father's previous marriage, Maximus had an older paternal half-sibling: Marcus Valerius Messalla Messallinus, who served as a consul in 3 BC. He also had a full sister, Valeria Messalina, who married Titus Statilius Taurus, consul in AD 11, and Maximus was the great-uncle of Lollia Paulina who was the third wife of Caligula and a relation to Statilia Messalina, the third wife of Nero. Marcus Valerius Messalla Corvinus, consul in 58, may have been his son.

== Ovid ==
Maximus was a friend and patron of the poet Ovid. He was one of the people to whom Ovid had addressed various letters which have survived to the present. Maximus was with Ovid in the year 8, when news arrived of Ovid's banishment. Maximus afterwards provided material, psychological, and possibly financial support to his friend. Although his friendship with Augustus didn't affect Ovid's banishment, Ovid believed as late as 11 that Maximus could successfully intercede with the Princeps.

== Political career ==
Maximus was a leading public figure throughout the reign of Tiberius and until at least 32, remained close to the emperor. After the trial and execution of Marcus Scribonius Libo Drusus in 16, Maximus in the Roman Senate proposed that the bust of Drusus should be barred from his descendants' funeral-parades. This proposal was politically significant, as the history of this particular punishment shows that Maximus held Drusus to be an enemy of the Roman people - hostis populi Romani. Maximus probably anticipated Tiberius’ approval. A prominent noble allied to the government would not knowingly exasperate the Princeps.

He became consul in 20. During his consulship, Maximus would ask the Roman Senate to speak first, for, when the emperor presided, it was custom to include officials among those called upon for their views.

According to a Greek inscription found at Ephesus, sometime after his consulship, Maximus became the Proconsul of Asia. The inscription, which honours Maximus, is dedicated to him by Alexander son of Memnon, to whom Maximus was both friend and benefactor. The inscription is dated from 25/26. The Greek inscription reads:

Μάρκον Αὐρήλιον
Κότταν Μάξιμον
Μεσσαλεῖνον τον
γενόμενον ἀνθύ-
πατον Ἀλέξαν-
δρος Μέμνονος τὸν
ἑαυτοῦ φίλον καὶ εὐ-
εργέτην

In 32, Tiberius successfully defended Maximus when prosecuted for accusing Caligula of homosexuality, ridiculing a banquet held to Tiberius’ late mother as a funeral feast, and boasting of Tiberius’ protection when he went to law.

== Reputation ==
Maximus was a poet and orator whom Tacitus condemns for his extravagant life-style, his shameful behavior and servility. Pliny the Elder describes him as an extravagant gourmet. Juvenal represents him as a patron of the arts.

One of Maximus' freedmen, Marcus Aurelius Zosimus, was buried on the Appian Way outside of Rome with his wife, Aurelia Saturnia. His epitaph is one of the few Roman funeral inscriptions that expresses patron-freedman relations in poetic terms. Below is a copy of the Latin inscription and an English translation:

M. Aurelius Cottae Maximi
Zosimus, accensus patroni.
Libertinus eram, fateor: sed facta legetur
patrono Cotta nobilis umbra mea.
Qui mihi saepe libens census donavit equestris
qui iussit natos tollere quos aleret
quique suas commisit opes mihi semper, et idem
dotavit natas ut pater ipse meas,
Cottanumque meum produxit honore tribuni
quem fortis castris Caesaris emeruit.
Quid non Cotta dedit? qui nune et carmina tristis
haec dedit in tumulo conspicienda meo.
Aurelia Saturnia, Zosimi.

I admit that I was a freedman; but now my shadow has been ennobled by my patron Cotta. Several times he was willing to grant me an equestrian fortune, he ordered me to let my children live so that he could provide for their upkeep. He was always ready to grant me his own wealth. He also gave my daughters the dowries a father provides. He promoted my son Cottanus to the rank of tribune in which he bravely served in Caesar’s army. What did Cotta not give us? Now, sadly, he provided these verses which can be read on my tomb.
Aurelia Saturnia, Zosimus’s [wife].

== See also ==
- Marcus Scribonius Libo Drusus

== Sources ==
- Tacitus, Annales
- C. Skidmore, Practical Ethics for Roman Gentlemen: The Works of Valerius Maximus, University of Exeter Press, 1996
- Velleius Paterculus – Translated with Introduction and Notes by J.C. Yardley & A.A. Barrett, The Roman History, Hackett Publishing, 2011
- A. Pettinger, The Republic in Danger: Drusus Libo and the Succession of Tiberius, Oxford University Press, 2012
- J.F. Gardner & T. Wiedemann, The Roman Household: A Sourcebook (Google eBook), Routledge, 2013
- Ovid: Poems from Exile
- Greek Inscription of Marcus Aurelius Cotta Maximus Messalinus

Political offices
Preceded by Marcus Junius Silanus Torquatus, and Publius Petronius as suffect consuls	Consul of the Roman Empire; 20 with Marcus Valerius Messala Barbatus	Succeeded by Tiberius Caesar Augustus IV, and Drusus Julius Caesar II as ordinary consuls
