= Lollia Paulina =

Roman empress in 38 AD

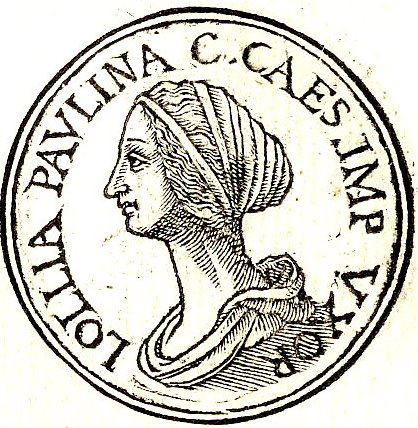
- Imaginary depiction of Lollia Paulina in the Promptuarium Iconum Insigniorum

Roman empress
- Tenure: 38 AD (six months)
- Born: AD 15; Rome, Italy
- Died: AD 49 (aged 34)
- Spouse: Publius Memmius Regulus; Caligula
- Father: Marcus Lollius
- Mother: Volusia Saturnina

Lollia Paulina (sometimes written Paullina) (c. 15 – 49 AD) was a Roman empress for six months in 38 as the third wife of the Roman emperor Caligula.

== Family background and early life ==
Paulina was a member of the plebeian gens Lollia. Paulina was the second daughter of Marcus Lollius with Volusia Saturnina, while her elder sister was Lollia Saturnina. Her cognomen "Paulina" probably derived from her maternal grandmother Nonia Polla.

Her father, Marcus Lollius, was a son of the Roman politician and military officer Marcus Lollius and his wife Aurelia. Aurelia was the adoptive sister of Marcus Aurelius Cotta Maximus Messalinus. Her possible paternal uncle may have been Publius Lollius Maximus, however this is unclear; he was at least a close relation.

Paulina was born and raised in Rome and became very wealthy after inheriting the estates of her relatives. She inherited large fortune from her paternal grandfather, Marcus Lollius.

== Marriages and rivals ==
Paulina's first husband was Publius Memmius Regulus, a man of consular rank, who served as a suffect consul in 31 and later as a Roman governor. Tacitus describes him as a man of 'dignity, who was a person of influence and good name', who died in 62.

In 38, Paulina was with Regulus in the province he was governing when Caligula ordered her to leave her husband upon overhearing a remark about the beauty of her grandmother. She was forced to divorce Regulus and marry Caligula, becoming his third wife and Roman Empress that same year. Caligula divorced her after six months of marriage, ostensibly because she was infertile, and forbade her to sleep with or associate with another man.

In 48, Paulina became a rival to Caligula's sister Agrippina the Younger. Paulina was considered as a potential fourth wife for Caligula's paternal uncle, the Roman emperor Claudius, following the execution of his third wife, the Roman empress Valeria Messalina. In 49, Agrippina the Younger married Claudius. Sometime after, Agrippina the Younger had Paulina charged with sorcery, accused of having entered into forbidden consultations with astrologers. Without a hearing, Paulina's property (including her gardens) was confiscated and she was sent into exile. Tacitus reported that Paulina was forced to commit suicide under the watch of a colonel of the Guards and implied that this was done on the orders of Agrippina the Younger. A sepulchre was not erected in her honor until the reign of the Roman emperor Nero.

== Reputation ==
Paulina is mentioned in Natural History by Pliny the Elder. Pliny mentions Paulina as an example of Roman ostentation for wearing a large share of her inheritance to a dinner party in the form of jewellery worth 50 million sesterces. She would wear her jewels in her hair, and around her neck, arms, and fingers. Pliny's complaint was made in the context of Rome spending enormous amounts importing Ancient India's 'useless' pepper and pearls, as worn by Paulina even on her shoes.

== In fiction ==
Paulina is a character in the novel series, I, Claudius, written by Robert Graves.

== See also ==
- List of Roman and Byzantine empresses

== Sources ==
- Suetonius, The Twelve Caesars
- Tacitus, Annales
- E. Groag, A. Stein & L. Petersen - e.a. (edd.), Prosopographia Imperii Romani saeculi I, II et III, Berlin, 1933-x, L 308. (PIR^{2})
- Horace - Edited by O.A.W Dilke, Horace: Epistles Book I, Taylor & Francis
- G. Highet, The Classical Tradition: Greek and Roman Influences on Western Literature, Oxford University Press, 1949
- S.J. Harrison, Homage to Horace: A Bimillenary Celebration, Oxford University Press, 1995
- G. Rickman, Roman Granaries and Store Buildings, CUP Archive, 1971
- J. Hazel, Who's Who in the Roman World, Routledge, 2001
- & articles of Lollia Paullina at ancient library*
- Marcus Lollius no. 5 article at ancient library
- Quintus Volusius no.2 article at ancient library
- A bit of History – Lollia Paullina Archived 2022-02-01 at the Wayback Machine
- Marcus Lollius’ article at Livius.org Archived 2013-10-30 at the Wayback Machine
- Lollius by D.C. O’Driscoll
- Genealogy of Volusius Saturninus by D.C. O’Driscoll
- Memmius Regulus by D.C. O’Driscoll
- Pliny the Elder’ article at Livius.org Archived 2014-07-12 at the Wayback Machine
- Romeins Imperium – Lucius Quintus Volusius Saturninus translated from Dutch to English
- Romeins Imperium – Lollia Paulina translated from Dutch to English
- After Actium: Two Caesars Are Not Enough: Chapter LXXXVII: The Trials of Livia Valeria
