= Salvia gens =

Ancient Roman family

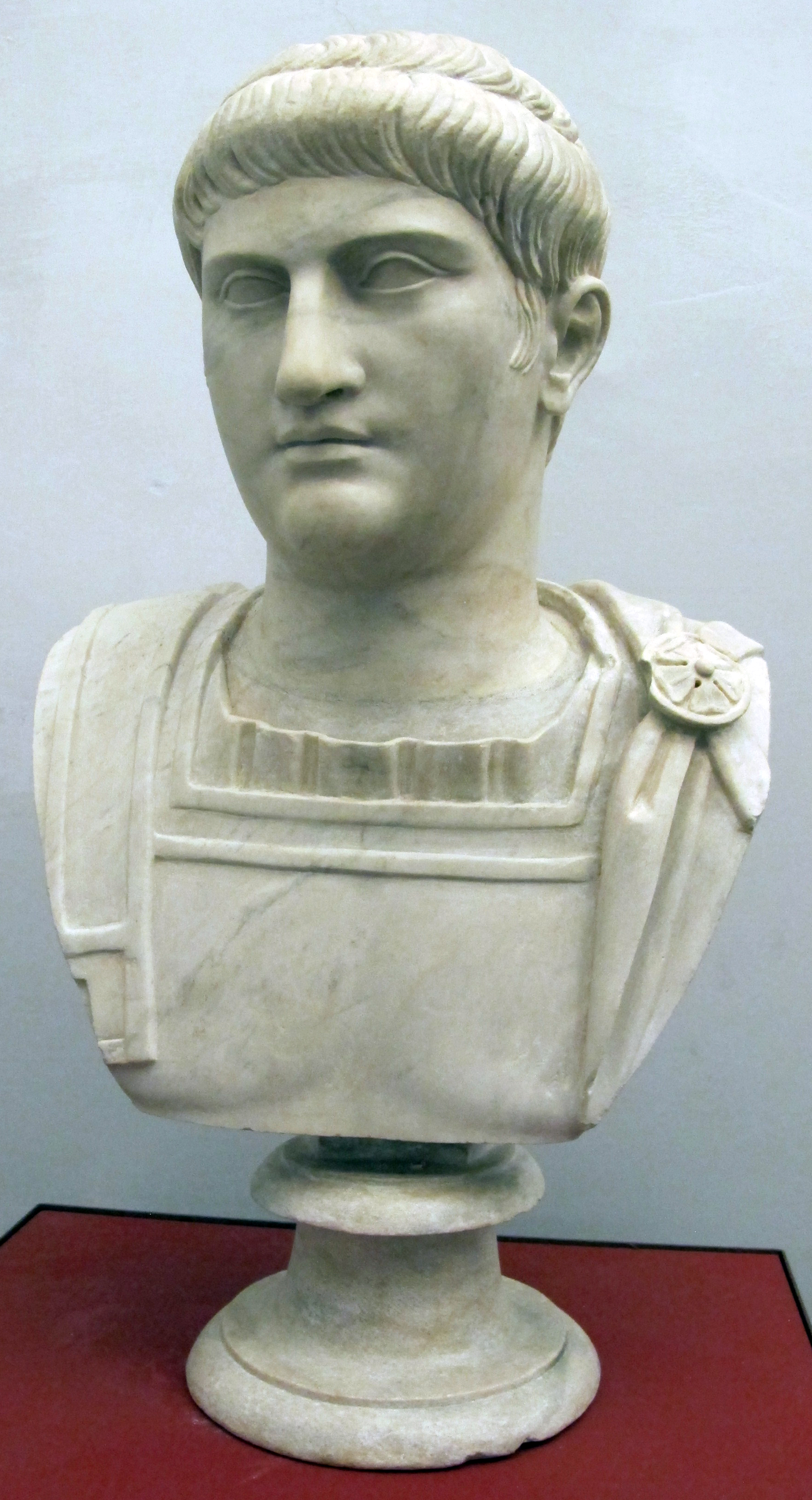
Bust of Emperor Otho from the 16th or 17th century.

The gens Salvia was a minor plebeian Roman family of the late Republic, which came to prominence under the early Empire. The first of the family known to have held public office at Rome was Publius Salvius Aper, praetorian prefect in 2 BC. About this time, the Salvii achieved equestrian rank, and thereafter held various positions in the Roman state for the next two centuries, before falling back into obscurity. Lucius Salvius Otho was raised to patrician rank by the emperor Claudius, but the most illustrious of the Salvii was his son, Marcus, who was proclaimed emperor in AD 69.

== Origin ==
The Salvii were doubtless of Sabellic origin, as their nomen is a patronymic surname derived from the common Oscan praenomen Salvius. They probably spread throughout Italy long before obtaining Roman citizenship; the emperor Otho was descended from an ancient and noble family of Ferentinum, in Etruria.

== Members ==
This list includes abbreviated praenomina. For an explanation of this practice, see filiation.

=== Salvii Othones ===
- Marcus Salvius Otho, grandfather of the emperor.
- Marcus Salvius Otho, moneyer and uncle of the emperor Otho.
- Lucius Salvius M. f. Otho, father of the emperor, was consul suffectus from the kalends of July, AD 34.
- Salvia, sister of Otho and fiancé of Drusus Caesar
- Lucius Salvius L. f. M. n. Otho Titianus, the elder brother of the emperor, was consul in AD 52.
- Marcus Salvius L. f. M. n. Otho, emperor from January 15 to April 16, AD 69.
- Lucius Salvius L. f. L. n. Otho Cocceianus, the emperor's nephew, was consul suffectus in AD 82.

=== Others ===
- Salvius, praefectus sociorum in 168 BC
- Salvius, praetor urbanus in around 76/74 BC and possibly the author of the Interdictum Salvianum
- Salvius, a centurion of the Gabiniani and one of the murderers of Pompey in 48 BC.
- Salvius, tribune of the plebs in 43 BC and the first man to be killed during the proscriptions by the Second Triumvirate
- Salvia Titisenia, a mistress of Octavian.
- Salvia Postuma, funded the building of an arch at Pola in Venetia and Histria, dating from the late first century BC. She was the husband of Lucius Sergius, and their son was Lucius Sergius Lepidus.
- Publius Salvius Aper, praetorian prefect with Quintus Ostorius Scapula in 2 BC. Aper is not known to have been related to the contemporary Othones.
- Salvius Carus, governor of Crete under Hadrian.
- Gaius Salvius Liberalis Nonius Bassus, consul suffectus in AD 85. He was a member of the Arval Brethren.
- Gaius Salvius Vitellianus, the son of Gaius Salvius Liberalis and Vitellia Rufilla.
- Lucius Octavius Cornelius Publius Salvius Julianus Aemilianus, an eminent jurist, was consul in AD 148.
- Publius Salvius L. f. Julianus, consul in AD 175.
- Salvius Tuscus became a Salian priest in AD 181; he served as quindecimvir in 204.

== See also ==
- List of Roman gentes
- Salvidia gens
- Salvidiena gens

== Bibliography ==
- Gaius Suetonius Tranquillus, De Vita Caesarum (Lives of the Caesars, or The Twelve Caesars).
- "Salvia Gens", in the Dictionary of Greek and Roman Biography and Mythology, William Smith, ed., Little, Brown and Company, Boston (1849).
- August Pauly; Georg Wissowa; Wilhelm Kroll; Kurt Witte; Karl Mittelhaus; Konrat Ziegler, eds. (1894–1980). Paulys Realencyclopädie der classischen Altertumswissenschaft. Stuttgart: J. B. Metzler.
- George Davis Chase, "The Origin of Roman Praenomina", in Harvard Studies in Classical Philology, vol. VIII (1897).
- Paul Rohden and Hermann Dessau, Page 11, Prosopographia Imperii Romani, Berlin (1898).
- H. F. Jolowicz and Barry Nicholas, Historical Introduction to the Study of Roman Law, Cambridge University Press (3rd edition, 1972).
