= AD 62 =

AD 62 in various calendars
- Gregorian calendar: AD 62; LXII
- Ab urbe condita: 815
- Assyrian calendar: 4812
- Balinese saka calendar: N/A
- Bengali calendar: −532 – −531
- Berber calendar: 1012
- Buddhist calendar: 606
- Burmese calendar: −576
- Byzantine calendar: 5570–5571
- Chinese calendar: 辛酉年 (Metal Rooster); 2759 or 2552 — to — 壬戌年 (Water Dog); 2760 or 2553
- Coptic calendar: −222 – −221
- Discordian calendar: 1228
- Ethiopian calendar: 54–55
- Hebrew calendar: 3822–3823
- Hindu calendars
- Vikram Samvat: 118–119
- Shaka Samvat: N/A
- Kali Yuga: 3162–3163
- Holocene calendar: 10062
- Iranian calendar: 560 BP – 559 BP
- Islamic calendar: 577 BH – 576 BH
- Javanese calendar: N/A
- Julian calendar: AD 62; LXII
- Korean calendar: 2395
- Minguo calendar: 1850 before ROC 民前1850年
- Nanakshahi calendar: −1406
- Seleucid era: 373/374 AG
- Thai solar calendar: 604–605
- Tibetan calendar: ལྕགས་མོ་བྱ་ལོ་ (female Iron-Bird); 188 or −193 or −965 — to — ཆུ་ཕོ་ཁྱི་ལོ་ (male Water-Dog); 189 or −192 or −964

AD 62 (LXII) was a common year starting on Friday of the Julian calendar. At the time, it was known as the Year of the Consulship of Marius and Afinius (or, less frequently, year 815 Ab urbe condita). The denomination AD 62 for this year has been used since the early medieval period, when the Anno Domini calendar era became the prevalent method in Europe for naming years.

== Events ==
=== By place ===
==== Roman Empire ====
- Emperor Nero marries for the second time, to Poppaea Sabina, ex-wife of Marcus Salvius Otho.
- After the death of Burrus and the disgrace of Seneca, Nero is free from their influence and becomes a megalomaniacal artist fascinated by Hellenism and the Orient. Tigellinus becomes Nero's counselor. His rule is highly abusive.
- Nero completes the Baths of Nero in Rome.
- A great earthquake damages cities in Campania, including Pompeii (February 5).
- The Parthians invade Armenia and lay siege to Tigranocerta. The city is well-fortified and garrisoned by the Romans. The assault fails and king Vologases I retreats. Instead, he makes preparations to invade Syria.
- Gnaeus Domitius Corbulo strengthens the fortifications on the Euphrates frontier. He builds a strong flotilla of ships equipped with catapults and a wooden bridge across the river, which allows him to establish a foothold on the Parthian shore.
- Lucius Caesennius Paetus advances towards Tigranocerta, but due to lack of supplies he makes camp for the winter in the fortress at Rhandeia in northwestern Armenia.
- Vologases I leads the Parthian army in a full-scale assault on the Euphrates. Legio X Fretensis and men of the other two legions (Legio III Gallica and Legio VI Ferrata) defend the eastern bank of the river, fighting off a desperate attack.
- Battle of Rhandeia: The Roman army (two legions) is defeated by the Parthians under king Tiridates I. Paetus surrenders and withdraws his disheveled army to Syria.
- A violent storm destroys 200 ships anchored at Portus.

=== By topic ===
==== Arts and sciences ====
- Lucan writes a history of the conflict between Julius Caesar and Pompey.
- The making of Still Life, a detail of a wall painting from Herculaneum, begins (finished in AD 79). It is now kept at Museo Nazionale in Naples.

==== Religion ====
- Paul of Tarsus is released from imprisonment in Rome (approximate date).

== Deaths ==
- June 8 – Claudia Octavia, wife of Nero (possibly executed) (b. AD 40)
- November 24 – Aulus Persius Flaccus, Roman poet (b. AD 34)
- Faustus Cornelius Sulla Felix, Roman consul (murdered) (b. AD 22)
- Gaius Rubellius Plautus, cousin of Nero (executed) (b. AD 33)
- James the Just, brother of Jesus (martyred) (approximate date)
- Lucius Caecilius Iucundus, Roman banker from Pompeii (b. c. AD 14)
- Sextus Afranius Burrus, Roman prefect and friend of Seneca (b. AD 1)
