= List of Roman governors of Pannonia =

This is a list of known governors of the Roman province of Pannonia. The province was created from the earlier province of Illyricum between AD 20 and 50. During the reign of Trajan, between the years AD 102 and 107, Pannonia was divided into Pannonia Superior and Pannonia Inferior.

== List of Roman governors ==
(This list is based on Werner Eck, "Jahres- und Provinzialfasten der senatorischen Statthalter von 69/70 bis 138/139", Chiron, 12 (1982), pp. 284–345.)

- Gaius Calvisius Sabinus (c. AD 39)
- Sextus Palpellius Hister (c. 50)
- Lucius Tampius Flavianus (69)
- Marcus Annius Afrinus (69-73)
- Gaius Calpetanus Rantius Quirinalis Valerius Festus (73-77)
- Titus Atilius Rufus (79-82)
- Lucius Funisulanus Vettonianus (82-86)
- Lucius Neratius Priscus (91-94)
- Gnaeus Pinarius Aemilius Cicatricula Pompeius Longinus (96-99)
- Lucius Julius Ursus Servianus (99-101)
- Quintus Glitius Atilius Agricola (100-103)
- Lucius Neratius Priscus (102-105)
- ? Publius Metilius Nepos (105/106)

== See also ==
- List of Roman governors of Pannonia Inferior
- List of Roman governors of Pannonia Superior
