= Petronius =

Roman courtier (27 – 66 AD)

- Born: c. 27 AD; Massalia (ancient Marseille)
- Died: c. 66 AD (aged c. 38–39); Cumae
- Occupation: Novelist
- Writing career
- Notable work: The Satyricon

Gaius Petronius Arbiter (/pɪˈtroʊniəs/; Classical Latin: [ˈɡaːiʊs pɛˈtroːniʊs arbɪtɛr]; c. 27 – c. 66 AD; sometimes Titus Petronius Niger) was a Roman courtier during the reign of Nero (r. 54–68). He is generally believed to be the author of the Satyricon, a satirical novel believed to have been written during the Neronian era.

He is one of the most important characters in Henryk Sienkiewicz's historical novel Quo Vadis (1895). Leo Genn portrays him in the 1951 film of the same name.

== Life ==
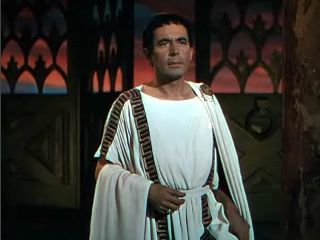
Leo Genn as Petronius in the 1951 film Quo Vadis

A reference to Petronius by Sidonius Apollinaris places him, or his Satyricon, in Massalia (ancient Marseille). He might have been born and educated there. Tacitus, Plutarch and Pliny the Elder describe Petronius as the elegantiae arbiter (also phrased arbiter elegantiarum), "judge of elegance", in the court of the emperor Nero. He served as suffect consul in 62. Later, he became a member of the senatorial class who devoted himself to a life of pleasure. His relationship to Nero was apparently akin to that of a fashion advisor.

Tacitus gives this account of Petronius in his historical work the Annals (XVI.18):

He spent his days in sleep, his nights in attending to his official duties or in amusement, that by his dissolute life he had become as famous as other men by a life of energy, and that he was regarded as no ordinary profligate, but as an accomplished voluptuary. His reckless freedom of speech, being regarded as frankness, procured him popularity. Yet during his provincial government, and later when he held the office of consul, he had shown vigour and capacity for affairs. Afterwards returning to his life of vicious indulgence, he became one of the chosen circle of Nero's intimates, and was looked upon as an absolute authority on questions of taste [elegantiae arbiter; note the pun on Petronius' cognomen] in connection with the science of luxurious living.

None of the ancient sources give any further detail about his life, or mention that he was a writer. However, a medieval manuscript written around 1450 of the Satyricon credited a "Titus Petronius" as the author of the original work. Traditionally, this reference is linked with Petronius Arbiter, since the novel appears to have been written or at least set during his lifetime. The link, however, remains speculative and disputed.

=== As a writer ===
Petronius's development of his characters in the Satyricon, namely Trimalchio, transcends the traditional style of writing of ancient literature. In the literature written during Petronius's lifetime, the emphasis was always on the typical considerations of the plot, which had been laid down by classical rules. The character, which was hardly known in ancient literature, was secondary. Petronius goes beyond these literary limitations in his exact portrayals of detailed speech, behaviour, surroundings, and appearance of the characters.

Another literary device Petronius employs in his novel is a collection of specific allusions. The allusions to certain people and events are evidence that the Satyricon was written during Nero's time: "The references to contemporary figures, the economic and social conditions offered by the novel, the legal arguments, and above all the literary connections with the younger Seneca and with Lucan, have combined to make this Neronian date highly probable." These also suggest that it was aimed at a contemporary audience which consisted in part of Nero's courtiers and even Nero himself.

The message Petronius tries to convey in his work is far from moral and does not intend to produce reform, but is written above all to entertain and should be considered artistically. Nevertheless, his writings can be a valuable tool to better comprehend the customs and ways of life of Roman society at that particular time, since the author strives to preserve the plausibility of his representation, as can be noted by the frequent use of allusions and detailed descriptions of characters and behaviours. As the title implies, the Satyricon is a satire, specifically a Menippean satire, in which Petronius satirizes nearly everything, using his taste as the only standard. It is speculated that Petronius's depiction of Trimalchio mirrors that of Nero. Although the author's own opinion is never alluded to, the opinions of the characters involved in the story are evident, as is how Encolpius criticizes Trimalchio.

=== Death ===
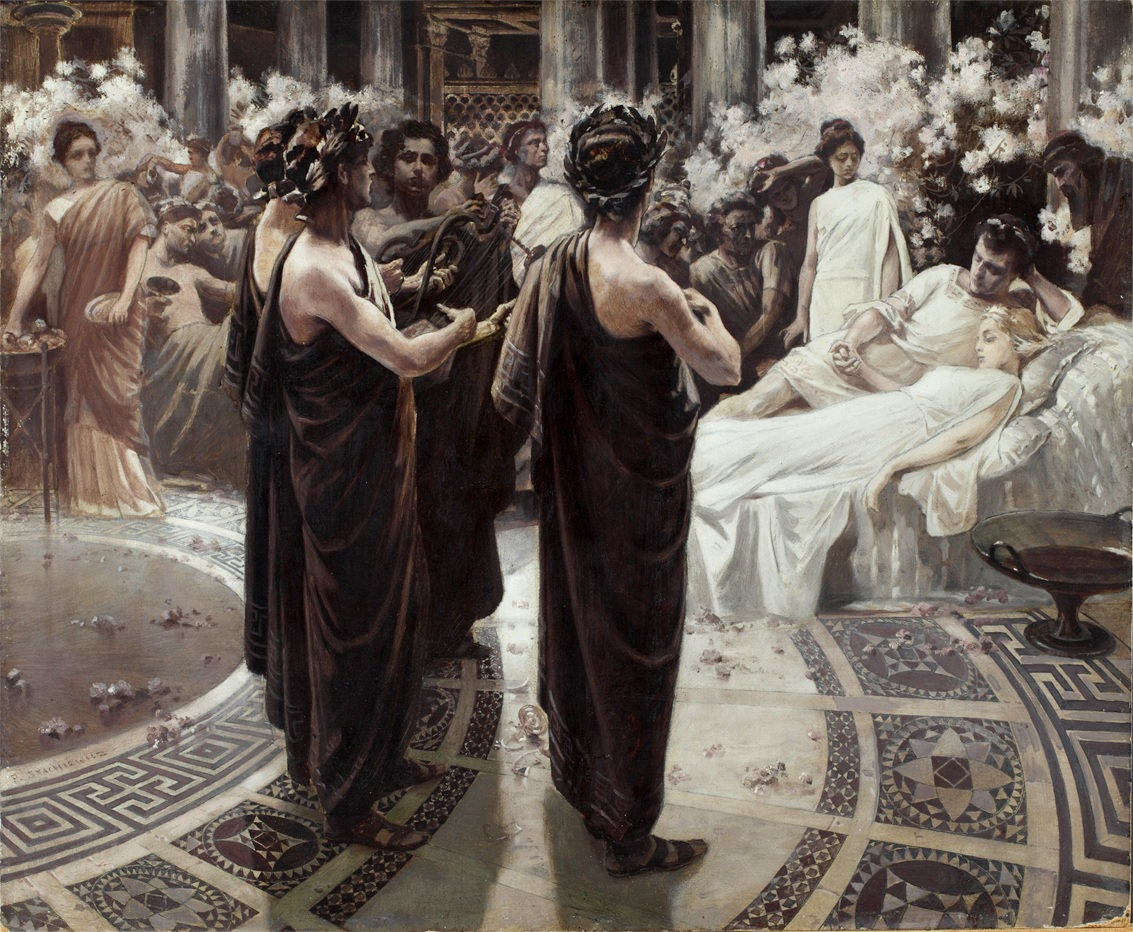
The Death of Petronius (Piotr Stachiewicz, c. 1900)

Petronius' high position soon made him the object of envy for those around him. Having attracted the jealousy of Tigellinus, the commander of the emperor's guard, he was accused of treason. He was arrested at Cumae in 65 AD but did not wait for a sentence. Instead, he chose to take his own life. Tacitus again records his elegant suicide in the sixteenth book of the Annals:

Yet he did not fling away life with precipitate haste, but having made an incision in his veins and then, according to his humour, bound them up, he again opened them, while he conversed with his friends, not in a serious strain or on topics that might win for him the glory of courage. And he listened to them as they repeated, not thoughts on the immortality of the soul or the theories of philosophers, but light poetry and playful verses. To some of his slaves, he gave liberal presents, a flogging to others. He dined, and indulged himself in sleep, that death, though forced on him, might have a natural appearance. Even in his will, he did not, as did many in their last moments, flatter Nero or Tigellinus or any other of the men in power. On the contrary, he described fully the prince's shameful excesses, with the names of his male and female companions and their novelties in debauchery, and sent the account under seal to Nero. Then he broke his signet-ring, that it might not be subsequently available for imperilling others.

According to Pliny the Elder: "T. Petronius, a consular, when he was going to die through Nero's jealousy and envy, broke his fluorspar wine-dipper so that the emperor's table would not inherit it. It had cost 300,000 sesterces". T. Petronius and G. Petronius have been said to have been the same man.

== See also ==
- Asteroid 3244 Petronius, named after the satirist
- Glossarium Eroticum
- Supplements to the Satyricon

== Notes ==
Political offices
Preceded by Publius Marius, and Lucius Afinius Gallus as Ordinary consuls	Suffect consul of the Roman Empire; 62 with Quintus Manlius Ancharius Tarquitius Saturninus	Succeeded by Quintus Junius Marullus, Titus Clodius Eprius Marcellus as Suffect consuls
