= Pedania gens =

Ancient Roman family

The gens Pedania was a minor plebeian family at Rome. Members of this gens are first mentioned at the time of the Second Punic War, but they achieved little prominence until imperial times, when the ill-starred Lucius Pedanius Secundus attained the consulship under Nero.

== Origin ==
The great majority of nomina ending in -anius were derived from place-names or cognomina ending in -anus. Such gentilicia were frequently, although not exclusively, of Umbrian origin. There is also an old Latin cognomen of frequent occurrence, Pedo, referring to someone with broad feet, which could have given rise to a similar nomen, although in this case Pedonius would be the expected form. However, Pedonius is not attested, nor are there clear examples of a surname Pedanus, so Pedo as the root of Pedanius remains a strong possibility.

== Members ==
This list includes abbreviated praenomina. For an explanation of this practice, see filiation.

- Titus Pedanius, the first centurion appointed over the principes in 211 BC, during the Second Punic War. At the siege of Capua, when the Roman forces were faltering, he led a charge over the enemy's ramparts, which resulted in the capture of the city. After the battle, Pedanius was decorated for his courage.
- Pedanius Costa, one of the legates of Brutus in 43 and 42 BC.
- Pedanius, one of the legates of Augustus who served as presidents of the court convened by Herod for the trial of his sons.
- Lucius Pedanius Secundus, consul suffectus ex Kal. Mart. in AD 43. He was praefectus urbi in 61, when he was murdered by one of his slaves. Under Roman law, all of the slaves belonging to the murdered man were to be put to death, in this instance numbering some four hundred; despite public outcry, the sentence was enforced by Nero.
- Lucius Pedanius L. f. Secundus Julius Persicus, named in an inscription from Barcino.
- Pedanius Costa, an opponent of Nero, and one of the candidates for the consulship in AD 69, the year following Nero's death. Vitellius chose not to designate him as one of the consuls for the coming year, because of his hostility to the late emperor.
- Pedanius, a soldier in the Roman cavalry, who participated in the capture of Jerusalem in AD 70. His daring in capturing one of the defenders through sheer strength and expert horsemanship is described by Josephus.
- Pedanius Dioscorides, a celebrated physician toward the end of the first century, and the author of De Materia Medica.

=== Pedanii Salinatores ===
- Gnaeus Pedanius Fuscus Salinator, consul suffectus ex Kal. Jul. in AD 61.
- Gnaeus Pedanius Cn. f. Fuscus Salinator, proconsul of Asia circa AD 100.
- Gnaeus Pedanius Cn. f. Cn. n. Fuscus Salinator, consul in AD 118, together with the emperor Hadrian. He married Julia, the daughter of Lucius Julius Ursus Servianus.
- Pedanius Fuscus Cn. f. Cn. n., the grandson of Lucius Julius Ursus Servianus, was put to death by Hadrian at the age of eighteen, in AD 136, along with his elderly grandfather, supposedly for expressing their disappointment at the emperor's designation of Lucius Ceionius Commodus as his heir.

== See also ==
- List of Roman gentes

== Bibliography ==
- Titus Livius (Livy), History of Rome.
- Valerius Maximus, Factorum ac Dictorum Memorabilium (Memorable Facts and Sayings).
- Publius Cornelius Tacitus, Annales.
- Flavius Josephus, Bellum Judaïcum (The Jewish War).
- Publius Cornelius Tacitus, Annales, Historiae.
- Lucius Cassius Dio Cocceianus (Cassius Dio), Roman History.
- Aelius Lampridius, Aelius Spartianus, Flavius Vopiscus, Julius Capitolinus, Trebellius Pollio, and Vulcatius Gallicanus, Historia Augusta (Augustan History).
- Dictionary of Greek and Roman Biography and Mythology, William Smith, ed., Little, Brown and Company, Boston (1849).
- Theodor Mommsen et alii, Corpus Inscriptionum Latinarum (The Body of Latin Inscriptions, abbreviated CIL), Berlin-Brandenburgische Akademie der Wissenschaften (1853–present).
- René Cagnat et alii, L'Année épigraphique (The Year in Epigraphy, abbreviated AE), Presses Universitaires de France (1888–present).
- George Davis Chase, "The Origin of Roman Praenomina", in Harvard Studies in Classical Philology, vol. VIII (1897).
- Paul von Rohden, Elimar Klebs, & Hermann Dessau, Prosopographia Imperii Romani (The Prosopography of the Roman Empire, abbreviated PIR), Berlin (1898).
- T. Robert S. Broughton, The Magistrates of the Roman Republic, American Philological Association (1952).
- Paul A. Gallivan, "Some Comments on the Fasti for the Reign of Nero", in Classical Quarterly, vol. 24, pp. 290–311 (1974).
