= Paullus Fabius Persicus =

Roman consul in ancient times

Paullus Fabius Persicus (2/1 BCE - some time during the reign of Claudius) was the only son of Paullus Fabius Maximus and Marcia, a maternal cousin of Augustus (daughter of his aunt Atia and L. Marcius Philippus) and great-niece of Julius Caesar. As such, Persicus was a first-cousin-once-removed of Augustus and a great-great-nephew of Julius Caesar.

== Birth and name ==
Paullus Fabius Persicus is believed to have been born in 2 or 1 BCE. His cognomen - like the praenomen (Paullus) he shared with his father - was given to him to advertise his natural paternal descent from Lucius Aemilius Paullus Macedonicus, who had defeated the last Macedonian monarch, Perseus, in 146 BCE.

== Life and career ==
The first appearance of Persicus is in June of the year 15, when he was co-opted into the Arval Brethren aged c. 15 to replace his then recently deceased father. Around the same time, he was also made a member of the College of Pontiffs and of the Sodales Augustales. He subsequently held the posts of quaestor under Tiberius and praetor, though the details of these posts are unknown. His next dated post is in 34, when he became ordinary consul with Lucius Vitellius, the father of the later Roman Emperor Vitellius, as his colleague.

After his consulship, his next post was proconsul of Asia in the reign of Claudius (c. 44). An edict written by Persicus from his time as proconsul of Asia survives, addressed to the Ephesians concerning issues in the worship of the Goddess Artemis.

He seems to have died sometime in the reign of Claudius.

== Character ==
According to Seneca the Younger, Persicus was a particularly vile person, who owed his career more to his ancestry than to his own merit. Ronald Syme adds, "He was also shunned by the virtuous and exemplary Julius Graecinus, the parent of Julius Agricola, unresponsive to the Narbonensian clientela of the Fabii."

== Footnotes ==
Political offices
Preceded by Lucius Salvius Otho, and Gaius Octavius Laenas as Suffect consuls	Consul of the Roman Empire; 34 with Lucius Vitellius	Succeeded by Quintus Marcius Barea Soranus (consul 34), and Titus Rustius Nummius Gallus as Suffect consuls
