= Gaius Octavius Laenas =

Roman senator

Gaius Octavius Laenas was a Roman senator who was active during the Principate. He was suffect consul in the second half of AD 33, the colleague of Lucius Salvius Otho. Laenas was also curator aquarum, or overseer of the aqueducts and water supply of Rome, from the death of Marcus Cocceius Nerva about the year 33 to the year 38.

Gaius Octavius Laenas also is important for genealogical reasons, as Edmund Groag and Ronald Syme explain. His parents were the obscure Octavius Laenas and Sergia, daughter of the patrician Lucius Sergius Plautus. A daughter, Sergia Plautilla, married Marcus Cocceius Nerva, by whom she was the mother of the future emperor Nerva.

The praenomen of Laenas' son is not recorded, but he married Rubellia Bassa, the daughter of a maternal cousin, Gaius Rubellius Blandus, who had been suffect consul in 18. Blandus' wife was Julia Livia, a granddaughter of the emperor Tiberius, so the marriage of the younger Laenas and Bassa aligned the Octavii Laenates with the ruling Julio-Claudian dynasty. Bassa and her husband appear to have had at least one child, evidently a son who sired Sergius Octavius Laenas Pontianus, consul in 131 under the emperor Hadrian.

Political offices
Preceded by Servius Sulpicius Galba; Lucius Cornelius Sulla Felix as ordinary consuls	Roman consul 33 (suffect) with Lucius Salvius Otho	Succeeded by Paullus Fabius Persicus; Lucius Vitellius as ordinary consuls
