= Lucius Vitellius (consul 34) =

Roman politician (d. 51 CE)

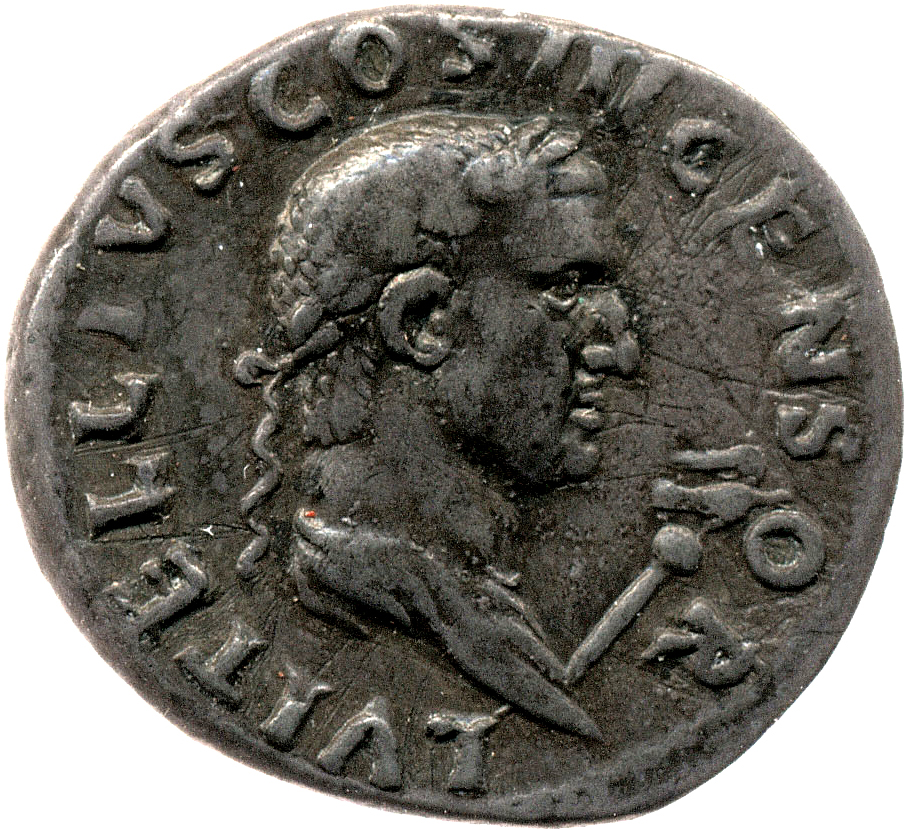
Lucius Vitellius on the reverse of a coin minted by his son.

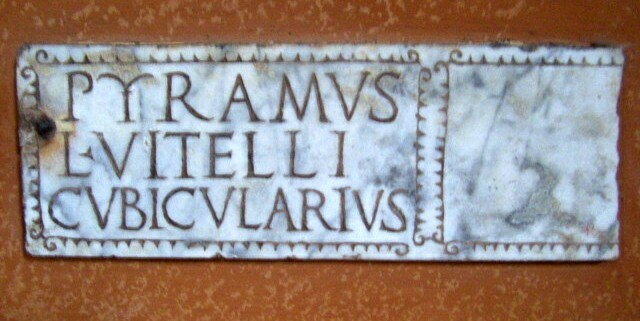
Titulus of Pyramus, the cubicularius of Lucius Vitellius

Lucius Vitellius (9 BC – AD 51) was the youngest of four sons of procurator Publius Vitellius and the only one of them who did not die as a result of political intrigue. He was consul three times, which was unusual during the Roman Empire for someone who was not a member of the Imperial family. The first time was in the year 34 as the colleague of Paullus Fabius Persicus; the second was in 43 as the colleague of the emperor Claudius; the third was in 47 again as the colleague of the emperor Claudius.

== Career ==
Under Emperor Tiberius, he was consul and in the following year governor of Syria in 35. He deposed Pontius Pilate in 36 after complaints from the people in Samaria. Josephus, in his Antiquities of the Jews, records that Lucius Vitellius wrote Tiberius to request that the Jewish high priestly robe be allowed back under Jewish control and this request was granted. He supported Emperor Caligula, and was a favorite of Emperor Claudius' wife Valeria Messalina. During Claudius' reign, he was Consul again twice, and governed Rome while the Emperor was absent on his invasion of Britain. Around the time that Claudius married Agrippina the Younger in 47, 48 or 49, Vitellius served as a Censor. He wielded great influence and was known for his outstanding character, though, at one time, a Senator accused him of treason. He died of paralysis in 51. Lucius received a state funeral and had a statue on the rostra bearing the inscription ‘steadfast loyal to the Emperor’.

== Family ==
Lucius married Sextilia, a reputable woman from a distinguished family, who gave birth to two sons, Aulus Vitellius Germanicus (the ephemeral Emperor in 69), and Lucius Vitellius.

== In fiction ==
Vitellius is a prominent character in Robert Graves's novel Claudius the God, in which he is portrayed as an intimate friend of Claudius. He also appears as a character in the final episode of the 1968 British television series The Caesars, portrayed by actor Gerald Harper.

Political offices
Preceded by Lucius Salvius Otho, Gaius Octavius Laenas as Suffect consuls	Roman consul 34 with Paullus Fabius Persicus	Succeeded by Quintus Marcius Barea Soranus, Titus Rustius Nummius Gallus as Suffect consuls
Preceded by Cornelius Lupus, Gaius Caecina Largus	Roman consul 43 with Claudius III	Succeeded by Sextus Palpellius Hister, Lucius Pedanius Secundus as Suffect consuls
Preceded by Gaius Terentius Tullius Geminus, Marcus Junius Silanus	Roman consul 47 with Claudius IV	Succeeded by Gaius Calpetanus Rantius Sedatus, Marcus Hordeonius Flaccus as Suffect consuls
