= Gnaeus Pedanius Fuscus Salinator =

1st century Roman senator and suffect consul

Gnaeus Pedanius Fuscus Salinator was a Roman senator active in the late 1st century AD. He is estimated to have been born between BCE 29 and 91 He was suffect consul in either AD 83 or 84. Salinator is known to have been proconsular governor of Asia in the years 98/99.

The Pedanii were an affluent family, whose origins lie in the colony of Barcino (modern Barcelona) in Hispania Tarraconensis. Salinator may be the son of Gnaeus Pedanius Fuscus Salinator, consul in 61, and is thought to be the father of Gnaeus Pedanius Fuscus Salinator, consul in 118.
