= Marcus Salvius Otho (grandfather of emperor Otho) =

Ancient Roman politician

- Occupation: moneyer
- Era: Augustan
- Known for: grandfather of emperor Otho
- Spouse: Titia (possibly)
- Children: Marcus Salvius Otho; Lucius Salvius Otho

Marcus Salvius Otho was an ancient Roman politician and grandfather of emperor Otho.

== Biography ==
=== Early life ===
Marcus Salvius Otho was a member to the Salvia gens. His father is described by Suetonius as an Eques (knight) of Etruscan descent whose ancestors came from Ferentinum and were descended from the princes of Etruria. His mother is not named and stated as being of lowly origin, and may not even have been freeborn. There have been many attempts at identifying Marcus' father, among them an Otho mentioned to have been a "puny-headed" follower of Julius Caesar in one of Catullus poems was proposed by Ernst Bickel, T. P. Wiseman and Bruce W. Frier have proposed that he may be the Salvius who was tribune of the plebs in 43 BC (and that this man was the son of an Urban praetor in 76 BC) who Elizabeth Rawson also identifies as the Salvius who was the first victim of the proscriptions of the Second Triumvirate. Joachim Losehand argued against a connection with the Gabinian centurion Salvius who assassinated Pompey.

Otho is presumed to have been born around 40 BC. He was raised and educated in the household of empress Livia, probably alongside her sons Tiberius and Drusus after their father died in 33 BC.

=== Career ===
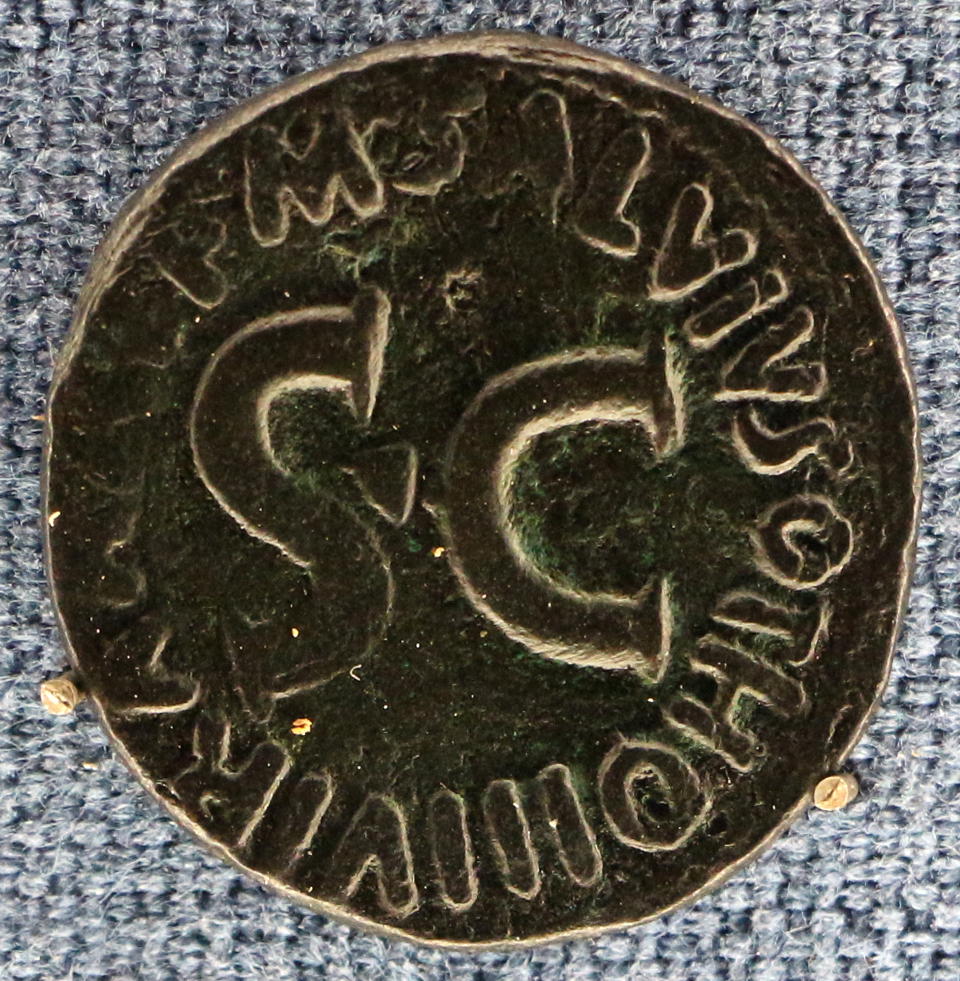
Coin minted by Otho, circa 7 BC.

Through Livia's influence he entered the senate and reached the praetorship. Unusually for a novus homo Otho was triumvir monetalis in an uncertain year, possibly 11 BC or 7 BC (as his coinage depicts Victoria crowning Augustus, perhaps celebrating Tiberius triumph that year).

=== Marriage ===
Otho married a woman whose identity is not known for certain, but Suetonius describes her as a noblewoman "allied to several great families". The appearance of the name "Titianus" among his descendants has led to speculation that she may have been a Titia. A Titia L. f. is known from inscription to have been the wife of a Salvius. This woman died young in 23 BC. He may have had a first-born homonymous son who became a moneyer, as well as the better known Lucius Salvius Otho, father of emperor Otho, (although there were rumours that Lucius was actually Tiberius' bastard).
