= Lucius Cornelius Sulla Felix (consul 33) =

First century AD Roman senator and consul

Lucius Cornelius Sulla Felix was a Roman senator of the first century AD. He was a consul ordinarius in AD 33 as the colleague of Galba, the future emperor. Felix was the son of Sulla Felix, a member of the Arval Brethren who died in AD 21, thus a direct descendant of the dictator Sulla. His mother was Sextia and his older brother was Faustus Cornelius Sulla.

Felix may be the Lucius Sulla Tacitus describes under the year 21 as coming into conflict with the future general Domitius Corbulo over who was of higher rank at a gladiatorial show. "Corbulo had age, national usage, and the feelings of the older senators in his favor," writes Tacitus. "Against him Mamercus Scaurus, Lucius Arruntius and other kinsmen of Sulla strenuously exerted themselves." The matter was brought to the Senate where arguments filled the room until Drusus intervened and brought the body back to order. The matter was resolved when both Sulla and Scaurus apologized to Corbulo. Ronald Syme argues for this identification, and as Scaurus is identified as Felix's uncle and step-father, concludes that Scaurus had married his mother Sextia after the death of his father, and the grandfather of Felix and the father of Scaurus had married the same woman.

An inscription recorded at Pisidian Antioch describes Felix as son-in-law to Germanicus; Ronald Syme interprets this as proof that he was briefly married to Agrippina between the death of Gnaeus Domitius Ahenobarbus in the year 41 and her marriage to Gaius Sallustius Crispus Passienus.

Political offices
Preceded by Cn. Domitius Ahenobarbus; Aulus Vitellius	Roman consul 33 with Servius Sulpicius Galba	Succeeded by Lucius Salvius Otho; Gaius Octavius Laenas as suffecti
