= Salvidia gens =

The gens Salvidia was an obscure plebeian family at ancient Rome. No members of this gens attained any of the higher offices of the Roman state, but several are known from inscriptions.

== Origin ==
The nomen Salvidius belongs to a large class of gentilicia formed using the suffix -idius. This termination originally applied to surnames ending in -idus, but over time it became so familiar that it came to be regarded as a regular gentile-forming suffix, and was applied even in cases where it was not orthographically justified. The root of the name is Salvius, a common Oscan praenomen. The nomen Salvidienus was formed from Salvidius using the suffix -enus.

== Members ==
This list includes abbreviated praenomina. For an explanation of this practice, see filiation.

- Salvidius, named in a fragmentary inscription from Corfinium in Samnium.
- Gaius Salvidius, named in an inscription from Corfinium.
- Salvidia Ɔ. l. Acume, a freedwoman, and one of the heirs of her sister, Salvidia Amphiola.
- Salvidia Sp. f. Amphiola, left a will at Corfinium, naming among her heirs her parents, Lucius Helvius Amphio and Salvidia Salvia, sister, Salvidia Acume, freedman, Theopropus, and Salvidia Decens.
- Salvidius Aper, built a tomb at Aeclanum in Campania for his wife, Claudia Crescentina, dating to the third century.
- Salvidia Ɔ. l. Auge, a freedwoman, who together with Marcus Arferius Aphrodisius, made a donation of seven pots at Rome.
- Salvidia T. l. Charmosyne, a freedwoman, and the mother-in-law of Helvia Asterio, according to a second-century inscription from Rome.
- Salvidia Decens, named among the heirs of Salvidia Amphiola. Their relationship is not preserved in the surviving inscription.
- Titus Salvidius T. l. Gallus, a freedman, and the brother of Helvia Asterio, according to a second-century inscription from Rome.
- Salvidia Macaria, together with her husband, Titus Flavius Abascantus, dedicated a monument at Rome to their son, Titus Flavius Mnester, aged twelve years, seven months, and seventeen days.
- Gaius Salvidius Hyacinthus, the husband of Vibia Prima, named in an inscription from Corfinium, dating between AD 30 and 70.
- Salvidia Ɔ. l. Salvia, a freedwoman, and one of the heirs of her daughter, Salvidia Amphiola.
- Salvidia T. f. Secunda, made an offering to Venus at Furfo in Samnium.

== See also ==
- List of Roman gentes
- Salvia gens

== Bibliography ==
- Theodor Mommsen et alii, Corpus Inscriptionum Latinarum (The Body of Latin Inscriptions, abbreviated CIL), Berlin-Brandenburgische Akademie der Wissenschaften (1853–present).
- Supplementa Italica (Supplement for Italy), Unione Accademica Nazionale.
- Notizie degli Scavi di Antichità (News of Excavations from Antiquity, abbreviated NSA), Accademia dei Lincei (1876–present).
- René Cagnat et alii, L'Année épigraphique (The Year in Epigraphy, abbreviated AE), Presses Universitaires de France (1888–present).
- George Davis Chase, "The Origin of Roman Praenomina", in Harvard Studies in Classical Philology, vol. VIII, pp. 103–184 (1897).
