= Lucius Pedanius Secundus =

First century Roman statesman, murdered by one of his slaves

Lucius Pedanius Secundus (d. AD 61) was a Roman senator of the first century. After he was murdered by one of his slaves, the senate and emperor Nero approved the execution of all four hundred under his ownership.

== Biography ==
The Pedanii had their roots as Roman colonists in the town of Barcino in Hispania Tarraconensis. Secundus' descendants include a series of consuls, beginning with his son Gnaeus Pedanius Fuscus Salinator, consul in AD 61.

In AD 43, during the reign of Claudius, Secundus was consul suffectus from the Kalends of March to the Kalends of July, together with Sextus Palpellius Hister. Secundus was the first senator from the Spanish provinces to achieve the rank of consul since the anomalous tenure of Lucius Cornelius Balbus in 40 BC. In 56, Nero appointed Secundus praefectus urbi.

In AD 61, Secundus was murdered by one of his slaves. The senate, moved by Gaius Cassius Longinus (Note: Not to be confused with the murderer of Caesar.) and others, approved the execution of all of Pedanius' four hundred slaves, in accordance with Roman law, for failing to prevent their master's murder. An abridged version of Longinus' speech was preserved by Tacitus. The people demanded the release of the hundreds of slaves who were innocent of the murder, but Nero deployed the Roman army to prevent the mob from disrupting the executions.

== See also ==
- Pedania (gens)

== Notes ==
Political offices
Preceded by Claudius III, and Lucius Vitellius II as Ordinary consuls	Suffect consul of the Roman Empire; 43 with Sextus Palpellius Hister	Succeeded by Aulus Gabinius Secundus, and ignotus as Suffect consuls
