= Lucius Salvius Otho =

Father of Roman emperor Otho

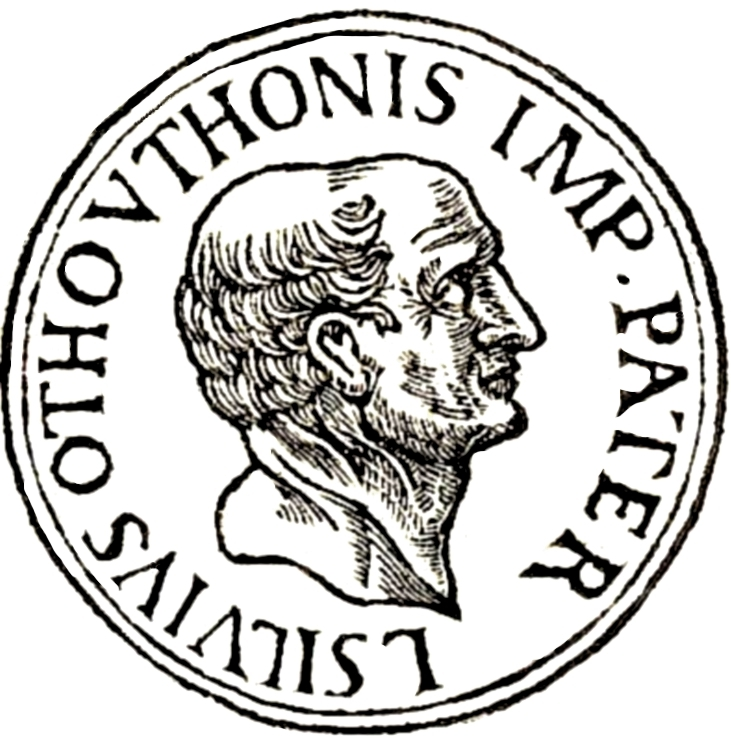
- Lucius Otho from Guillaume Rouillé's Promptuarii Iconum Insigniorum
- Known for: father of Roman emperor Otho
- Spouses: unknown; Albia Terentia
- Children: Salvia; Lucius Salvius Otho Titianus; Marcus Salvius Otho
- Parents: Marcus Salvius Otho (father); Titia (possibly) (mother)

Lucius Salvius Otho was the father of the Roman emperor Otho. He was born of a distinguished and well-connected family on his mother's side. His close friendship with Tiberius, and physical similarity to him, led to rumours that he was Tiberius's son.

== Biography ==
=== Early life ===
Lucius was the son of a Marcus Salvius Otho, whose father was an Etruscan. Marcus had been raised in empress Livia's home. His mother's identity is unknown, although she is described as having been well connected. The appearance of the name "Titianus" in his family has led to speculation that she may have been from the gens Titia. Potentially a daughter of Marcus Titius and his wife Fabia Paullina, but possibly his sister or niece instead. A Titia L. f. is known from inscription to have been the wife of a Salvius. This woman died young in 23 BC. It is not certain if this woman was Otho's mother or possibly grandmother. Regardless, Lucius was widely assumed to be emperor Tiberius's illegitimate son, due to the excessive affection Tiberius bestowed on him, as well as a strong physical resemblance. This was a double edged sword for his children as it made them related to the Julio-Claudians, but also connected them to Tiberius, who was unpopular with the people of Rome. Ronald Syme thought Lucius might have been born as late as 6 BC, but possibly earlier, if Titia L. f was his mother then he would have to have been born in 23 BC at the latest. Tiberius would have been around 19 at this time.

=== Career ===
Lucius was renowned for the severity of his command in the regular offices at Rome, the proconsulate of Africa, and several special military commands. He was made consul suffectus in July 33 AD. In Illyricum, in 42, some soldiers supported a rebellion against Claudius by Illyricum's governor, Lucius Arruntius Camillus Scribonianus. Afterwards, they tried to cover the revolt up by killing their officers, who were the revolt's ringleaders. Claudius promoted them for doing so, but Lucius had them executed in his presence in the principia for killing their officers.

He rebuilt his reputation at court by forcing the slaves of an unnamed knight to betray their master's plot to kill the emperor. As a result, the Senate set up his statue in the palace, and Claudius enrolled him among the patricians, praising him in the highest terms and calling him "a man of greater loyalty than I can even pray for in my own children".

== Marriage and issue ==
Lucius is known to have had two sons and at least one daughter.

- A daughter Salvia (possibly born around 12 AD), whom he betrothed to Tiberius' adoptive grandson and great-nephew Drusus Caesar at a very young age. It has been speculated that the marriage did not end up happening because this girl died young, but this is not certain, it is possible the engagement was simply broken off due to politics within the Julio-Claudian family (such as rising tensions between Tiberius and Agrippina the Elder). In De vita Caesarum Suetonius states that on the day of his suicide emperor Otho wrote a letter of condolences to a sister. (Note: But it has been noted that no sister is mentioned in the message Vitellius sent to Titianus threatening his family.)
- Lucius Salvius Otho Titianus, consul in 52
- Emperor Otho

Suetonius claims that Lucius wife Albia Terentia was the mother of both of his sons, but the age difference between his older son Titianus and the emperor Otho has prompted some historians such as Ronald Syme and Charles Murison to doubt the plausibility of this and speculate that Titianus and Drusus's fiancée may have been the children of an earlier wife.

== Notes ==
Political offices
Preceded by Galba; L. Cornelius Sulla Felix	Roman consul July–December 33 with Gaius Octavius Laenas	Succeeded by Paullus Fabius Persicus; Lucius Vitellius
