= Glossarium Eroticum =

Book

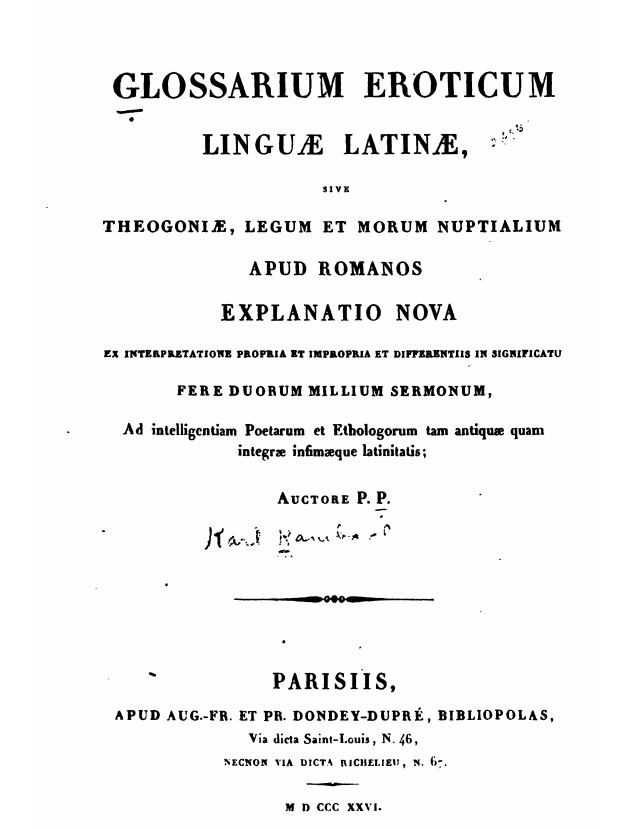

Glossarium Eroticum is a Latin-language dictionary of sexual words and phrases, and of many pertaining to the human body or considered to be obscene, by Pierre-Emmanuel Pierrugues, published in 1826. It lists definitions and excerpts Old Latin and Classical Latin writers such as Plautus, Juvenal, Petronius, and Seneca in examples, and includes some Medieval Latin as well.
