= Gaius Titius Antonius Peculiaris =

3rd century Roman politician

- Born: Aquincum
- Citizenship: Roman
- Title: decurio coloniae Septimiae Aquincensium quaestor coloniae Septimiae Aquincensium aedilis coloniae Septimiae Aquincensium decurio municipii Aelii Singidunensium equo publico IIvir coloniae Septimiae Aquincensium flamen coloniae Septimiae Aquincensium sacerdos Arae Augusti nostri provinciae Pannoniae Inferioris
- Father: Gaius
- Family: gens Titia

Gaius Titius Antonius Peculiaris (fl. early 3rd century) was a Roman eques from Aquincum who held important offices in Pannonia.

== Life ==
Peculiaris was born in the Sergia tribe, most likely in Aquincum (modern-day Budapest). His father Gaius was a member of the gens Antonia, a family that—along with the gens Iulia—practically controlled the tax on trade (portorium) in Illyricum as tenants (conductores). He was thus a relative of Gaius Antonius Rufus, one of the earliest who started this job. Peculiaris, through the adoption of his father, was a late member of the gens Titia, an Aquileian merchant family. His father kept his original nomen gentilicium and cognomen. The Titius name was common in Northern Italy and Dalmatia. The Antonius name was rare among those Pannonians who descended from the Italian Peninsula and not the eastern provinces. Not many attestations of his cognomen survive, only three from the territory of Pannonia. It means "from own property".

Most likely he lived and held his first administrative posts in his birthplace, having been made decurio there. According to his Bátmonostor inscription, he entered the ordo equester subsequently, and then became the decurio of another city, Singidunum (modern-day Belgrade). Possibly another inscription from Aquincum baring his name attributes to him. It mentions Peculiaris's decurionatus in both cities. This is a peculiarity shared only by one other eques. He was also a member of the city's council. This is explained by the business and possible magistrates of his father there that he may have continued.

Next, he served as flamen and duumvir in Aquincum and/or Singidunum, most likely the former. He completed the cursus honorum in either of these cities. His appointment as high priest of Pannonia Inferior at the zenith of career suggests the former. He held this position under a single emperor, so maybe after 212. Two of his munera to the inhabitants of Aquincum are known: he gifted a nymphaeum whose water supply he took care of, and decorated the forum.

== Sources ==
- Agócs, Nándor (2017). 'Dignitas, Auctoritas, Maiestas és Potestas' Pannoniában ['Dignitas, Auctorias, Maiestas and Potestas' in Pannonia] (PDF). Pécs: L'Harmattan. ISBN 9789634145745.
- Kovács, Péter (2004). "Some notes on the building inscription of C(aius) Titius Antonius Peculiaris from Bátmonostor (CIL III 10496=6452)". In Găzdac, Cristian; Roman, Cristian; Ciongradi, Carmen; Ruscu, Ligia; Ardevan, Radu (eds.). ORBIS ANTIQVVS: Studia in honorem Ioannis Pisonis. Vol. BIBLIOTHECA MVSEI NAPOCENSIS XXI. Cluj-Napoca: National Museum of Transylvanian History. ISBN 973-7951-55-7.
- Fishwick, Duncan (2000). Merkelbach, Reinhold; Koenen, Ludwig (eds.). "The Career of C. Titius Antonius Peculiaris". Zeitschrift für Papyrologie und Epigraphik. 130. Dr. Rudolf Habelt GmbH. ISSN 0084-5388.
- Szabó, Edit (2003). A pannoniai városok igazgatása. Urbanizáció, önkormányzat és városi elit a Kr. u. 1–3. században a feliratok tükrében [Management of the Pannonian cities. Urbanization, self-governance and urban elite in the 1–3rd centuries AD from the inscriptions' perspective]. Debrecen.
