= Gnaeus Pedanius Fuscus Salinator (consul 61) =

1st century AD Roman senator and suffect consul

Gnaeus Pedanius Fuscus Salinator was a Roman senator who was active under the Principate. He was suffect consul in the nundinium of July-August 61 as the colleague of Lucius Velleius Paterculus. He is known entirely from inscriptions.

The Pedanii were an affluent family, whose origins lie in the colony of Barcino (modern Barcelona) in Hispania Tarraconensis. Salinator may be the son of Lucius Pedanius Secundus, consul in 43, and is thought to be the father of Gnaeus Pedanius Fuscus Salinator, consul in 83 or 84.

Political offices
Preceded by Publius Petronius Turpilianus, and Junius Caesennius Paetus as suffect consuls	Suffect consul of the Roman Empire; 61 with Lucius Velleius Paterculus	Succeeded by Publius Marius, and Lucius Afinius Gallus as ordinary consuls
