= Titia gens =

Ancient Roman family

The gens Titia was a plebeian family at ancient Rome. The gens is rarely mentioned in the Republican period, and did not rise out of obscurity till a very late time. None of its members obtained the consulship under the Republic, and the first person of the name who held this office was Marcus Titius in BC 31.

== Origin ==
The nomen Titius is a patronymic surname, based on the praenomen Titus. Titus was roughly the sixth-most common Latin praenomen throughout Roman history. However, it has been conjectured that it was introduced to Latin through Titus Tatius, a Sabine king in the time of Romulus, who came to Rome with many of his subjects. If Titus was originally a Sabine praenomen, then the Titii may have been Sabines. But it is also possible that Titus was common to both the Latin and Oscan tongues.

== Praenomina ==
The Titii used a wide variety of praenomina, including Gaius, Quintus, Sextus, Lucius, Publius, Marcus, and Titus. All of these were very common names.

== Branches and cognomina ==
During the later years of the Republic, some of the Titii appear with the surnames Rufus, meaning "red" or "reddish", and Strabo, referring to one who squints. These may have been family-names, as at least two individuals in the gens bore these cognomina. Numerous surnames occur in imperial times, including Sabinus, Proculus, Aquilinus, and Gemellus, amongst others.

== Members ==
This list includes abbreviated praenomina. For an explanation of this practice, see filiation.

- Gaius Titius, an eques of the second century BC, and an orator of considerable merit, praised by Cicero.
- Gaius Titius, a pleader of causes, who excited a mutiny of the soldiers against the consul Lucius Porcius Cato in 89 BC, and escaped punishment.
- Sextus Titius, tribune of the plebs in 99 BC, attempted to follow in the footsteps of Saturninus, but was resisted by the consul Marcus Antonius.
- Quintus Titius, triumvir monetalis in 90 BC.
- Lucius Titius, a Roman citizen at Agrigentum, who was robbed of his ring by Verres.
- Titus Titius T. f., the legate of Gnaeus Pompeius, when the latter was entrusted with the superintendence of the corn-market.
- Gaius Titius L. f. Rufus, praetor urbanus in 50 BC.
- Quintus Titius, sent by Caesar into Epirus in 48 BC to obtain corn for his troops.
- Lucius Titius, a military tribune during the Alexandrine war, 48 BC.
- Gaius Titius Strabo, an opponent of Caesar at the time of his death.
- Lucius Titius Strabo, an eques, whom Cicero introduced to Brutus.
- Publius Titius, tribune of the plebs in 43 BC, proposed the lex Titia, which created the Second Triumvirate.
- Lucius Titius, proscribed by the triumvirs in 43 BC, but escaped to Sextus Pompeius in Sicilia. He married Munatia, the sister of the orator Lucius Munatius Plancus.
- Marcus Titius L. f., consul suffectus in 31 BC, routed the cavalry of Marcus Antonius shortly before the Battle of Actium.
- Lucius Titius, perhaps a brother of Marcus Titius, the consul of 31 BC, was the father-in-law of a Salvius, possibly Marcus Salvius Otho, grandfather of the emperor Otho.
- Titia L. f., the wife of a Salvius, possibly Marcus Salvius Otho, grandfather of the emperor Otho. She died as a young woman in 23 BC.
- Titius Julianus, probably a mistake for Tettius Julianus.
- Titius Septimius, a minor poet, about whose welfare Horace inquired in 20 BC.
- Titius Sabinus, an eques, and friend of Germanicus, betrayed by Sejanus and put to death.
- Titius Rufus, put to death in the reign of Caligula, for saying that the senate thought differently from what it said.
- Titius Proculus, put to death in AD 48, because he had been privy to the adulteries of Gaius Silius and Messalina.
- Marcus Titius Marcellus, owned a brick producing business.
- Titius Aristo, (Note: In some editions, Titus Aristo.) a distinguished jurist, was a friend of Pliny the Younger, who praised his knowledge and practice of the law.
- Marcus Titius M. f. Lustricius Bruttianus, a decorated soldier who had won both the mural and vallary crowns, served as military tribune, plebeian aedile, quaestor, and praetor. He was consul suffectus in AD 108, and subsequently governor of Achaia. Pliny the younger reports that he was falsely accused by a colleague, Montanius Atticinus, whose misconduct he had uncovered, but acquitted by Trajan.
- Titia Quartilla, owner of a pottery production business, she was possibly the granddaughter of M. Titius Marcellus and the sister of Lucius Titius Epidius Aquilinus.
- Lucius Titius Epidius Aquilinus, consul in AD 125.
- Lucius Titius Plautius Aquilinus, consul ordinarius in AD 162.
- Titius Gemellus, a sculptor, of uncertain date.
- Gaius Titius Antonius Peculiaris, an eques

== See also ==
- List of Roman gentes

== Bibliography ==
- Marcus Tullius Cicero, Brutus, De Oratore, Pro Gaio Rabirio Perduellionis Reo, In Verrem, Epistulae ad Familiares.
- Gaius Julius Caesar, Commentarii de Bello Civili (Commentaries on the Civil War).
- Aulus Hirtius, De Bello Alexandrino.
- Quintus Horatius Flaccus (Horace), Epistulae.
- Marcus Velleius Paterculus, Compendium of Roman History.
- Gaius Plinius Secundus (Pliny the Elder), Naturalis Historia (Natural History).
- Gaius Plinius Caecilius Secundus (Pliny the Younger), Epistulae (Letters).
- Publius Cornelius Tacitus, Annales.
- Appianus Alexandrinus (Appian), Bellum Civile (The Civil War).
- Lucius Cassius Dio Cocceianus (Cassius Dio), Roman History.
- Ambrosius Theodosius Macrobius, Saturnalia.
- Jean-Jacques Boissard, Romanae Urbis Topographia et Antiquitates (1597–1602).
- Joseph Hilarius Eckhel, Doctrina Numorum Veterum (The Study of Ancient Coins, 1792–1798).
- Karl Julius Sillig, Catalogus Artificium sive Architecti Statuarii Sculptores Pictores Caelatores et Scalptores Graecorum et Romanorum (Catalogue of Artists, with Greek and Roman Architects, Statuaries, Sculptors, Painters, Ornamenters, and Engravers), Libraria Arnoldia, Dresden and Leipzig (1827).
- Desiré-Raoul Rochette, Lettre à M. Schorn, Firmin Didot Frères, Paris (1832).
- Henricus Meyerus, Oratorum Romanorum Fragmenta ab Appio inde Caeco usque ad Q. Aurelium Symmachum (Fragments of Roman Orators from Appius Claudius Caecus to Quintus Aurelius Symmachus). L. Bourgeois-Mazé, Paris (1837).
- Dictionary of Greek and Roman Biography and Mythology, William Smith, ed., Little, Brown and Company, Boston (1849).
- René Cagnat et alii, L'Année épigraphique (The Year in Epigraphy, abbreviated AE), Presses Universitaires de France (1888–present).
- George Davis Chase, "The Origin of Roman Praenomina", in Harvard Studies in Classical Philology, vol. VIII (1897).
- D.P. Simpson, Cassell's Latin and English Dictionary, Macmillan Publishing Company, New York (1963).
- Adriana Emiliozzi, "[www.persee.fr/doc/mefr_0223-5102_1983_num_95_2_1388 Sull'epitaffio del 67 a. C. nel sepolcro dei Salvii a Ferento]", in Mélanges de l'École française de Rome, vol. 95, No. 2, pp. 701–717 (1983).
- Benoît Rossignol, "Fouilles au forum antique : Marcus Titius, découverte d’un Vaisonnais au sommet de l’Empire" (2015), cited by Werner Eck, "Position and Authority of the Provincial Legate and the Financial Procurator in Judaea, 70–136 AD", in Jews and Christians in the First and Second Centuries: The Interbellum 70‒132 CE, Joshua J. Schwartz, Peter J. Tomson, eds., Brill (2017), p. 103.
- Giovanna Ottavianelli, "Sulle tracce di un imperatore di origini ferentiensi: Marcus Salvius Otho", at Archeotuscia.com, pp. 25–29 (2019).
- Opus. Vol. 5. 1986.
- Birley, Anthony (2000). Onomasticon to the Younger Pliny Letters and Panegyric. K.G. Saur. ISBN 9783110958287.
