= Otho =

Roman emperor in AD 69

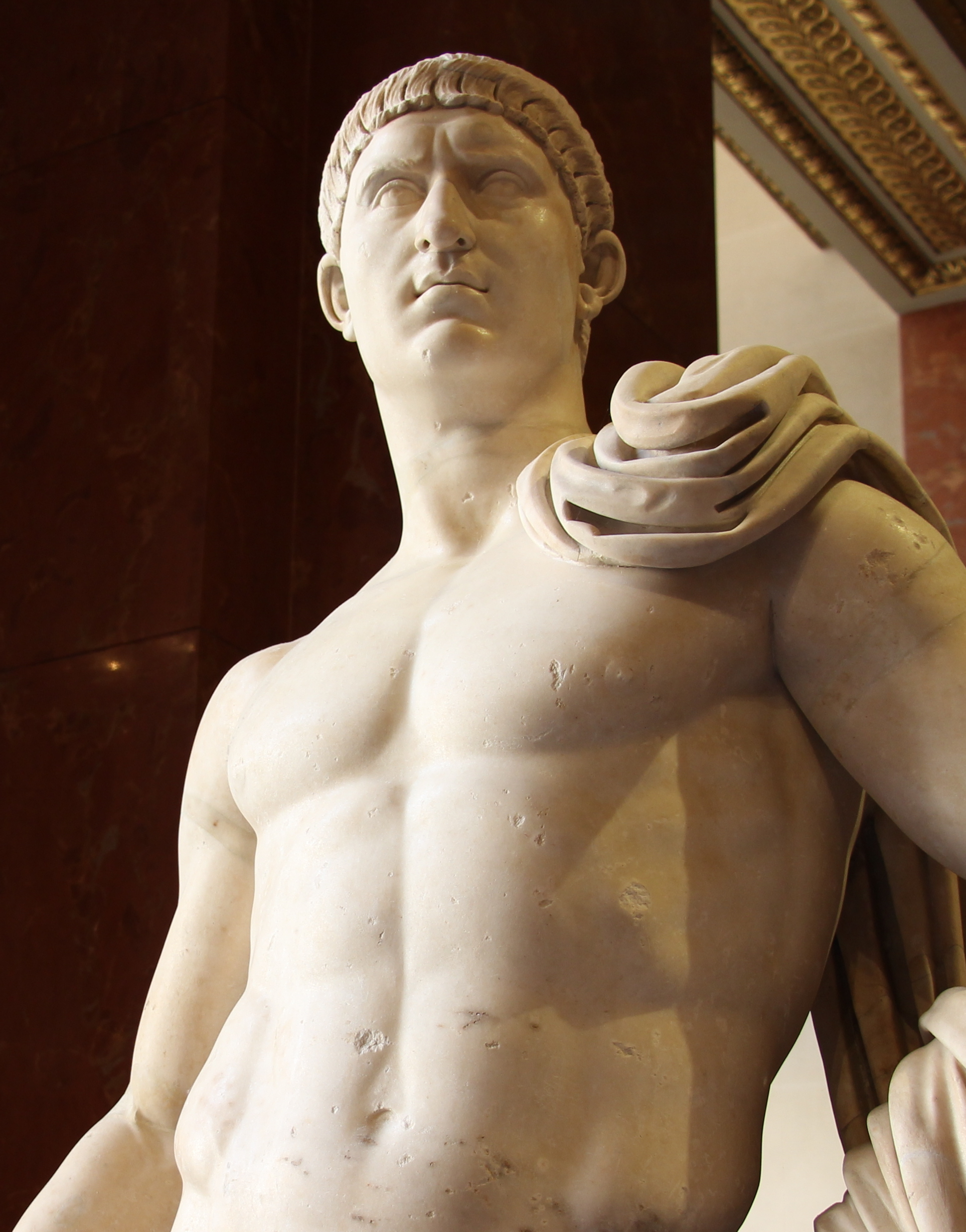
- Detail of a statue of Otho at the Louvre

Roman emperor
- Reign: 15 January – 16 April 69
- Predecessor: Galba
- Successor: Vitellius
- Born: Marcus Salvius Otho; 28 April 32; Ferentium, Italy
- Died: 16 April 69 (aged 36); Brixellum
- Spouse: Poppaea Sabina (forced by Nero to divorce her)
Regnal name
- Imperator Marcus Otho Caesar Augustus
- Father: Lucius Salvius Otho
- Mother: Albia Terentia

Marcus Salvius Otho (/ˈoʊθoʊ/; 28 April 32 – 16 April 69) was Roman emperor, ruling for three months from 15 January to 16 April 69. He was the second emperor of the Year of the Four Emperors.

A member of a noble Etruscan family, Otho was initially a friend and courtier of the young emperor Nero until he was effectively banished to the governorship of the remote province of Lusitania in 58 following his wife Poppaea Sabina's affair with Nero. After a period of moderate rule in the province, he allied himself with Galba, the governor of neighbouring Hispania Tarraconensis, during the revolts of 68. He accompanied Galba on his march to Rome, but revolted and murdered Galba at the start of the next year.

Inheriting the problem of the rebellion of Vitellius, commander of the army in Germania Inferior, Otho led a sizeable force which met Vitellius' army at the Battle of Bedriacum. After initial fighting resulted in 40,000 casualties, and a retreat of his forces, Otho committed suicide rather than continue fighting, and Vitellius was proclaimed emperor.

== Early life ==
Otho was born on 28 April 32 AD. His grandfather Marcus had been a senator, and Claudius granted patrician status to Otho's father Lucius Salvius Otho.

Suetonius, in The Lives of the Caesars, comments on Otho's appearance and personal hygiene:

He is said to have been of moderate height, splay-footed and bandy-legged, but almost feminine in his care of his person. He had the hair of his body plucked out, and because of the thinness of his locks wore a wig so carefully fashioned and fitted to his head, that no one suspected it. Moreover, they say that he used to shave every day and smear his face with moist bread, beginning the practice with the appearance of the first down, so as never to have a beard.

Juvenal, in a passage in the Satire II ridiculing male homosexuality, specifically mentions Otho as being vain and effeminate, looking at himself in the mirror before going into battle, and "plaster[ing] his face with dough" in order to look good.

Greenhalgh writes that "he was addicted to luxury and pleasure to a degree remarkable even in a Roman". An aged freedwoman brought him into the company of the emperor Nero. Otho married the emperor's mistress Poppaea Sabina; Nero forced Otho to divorce Poppaea so that he himself could marry her. He exiled Otho to the province of Lusitania in 58 or 59 by appointing him to be its governor.

Otho proved to be capable as governor of Lusitania, yet he never forgave Nero for marrying Poppaea. He allied himself with Galba, governor of neighboring Hispania Tarraconensis, in the latter's rebellion against Nero in 68. Nero committed suicide later that year, and Galba was proclaimed emperor by the Senate. Otho accompanied the new emperor to Rome in October 68. Before they entered the city, Galba's army fought against a legion that Nero had organized.

== Reign, decline and fall ==
=== Overthrow of Galba ===
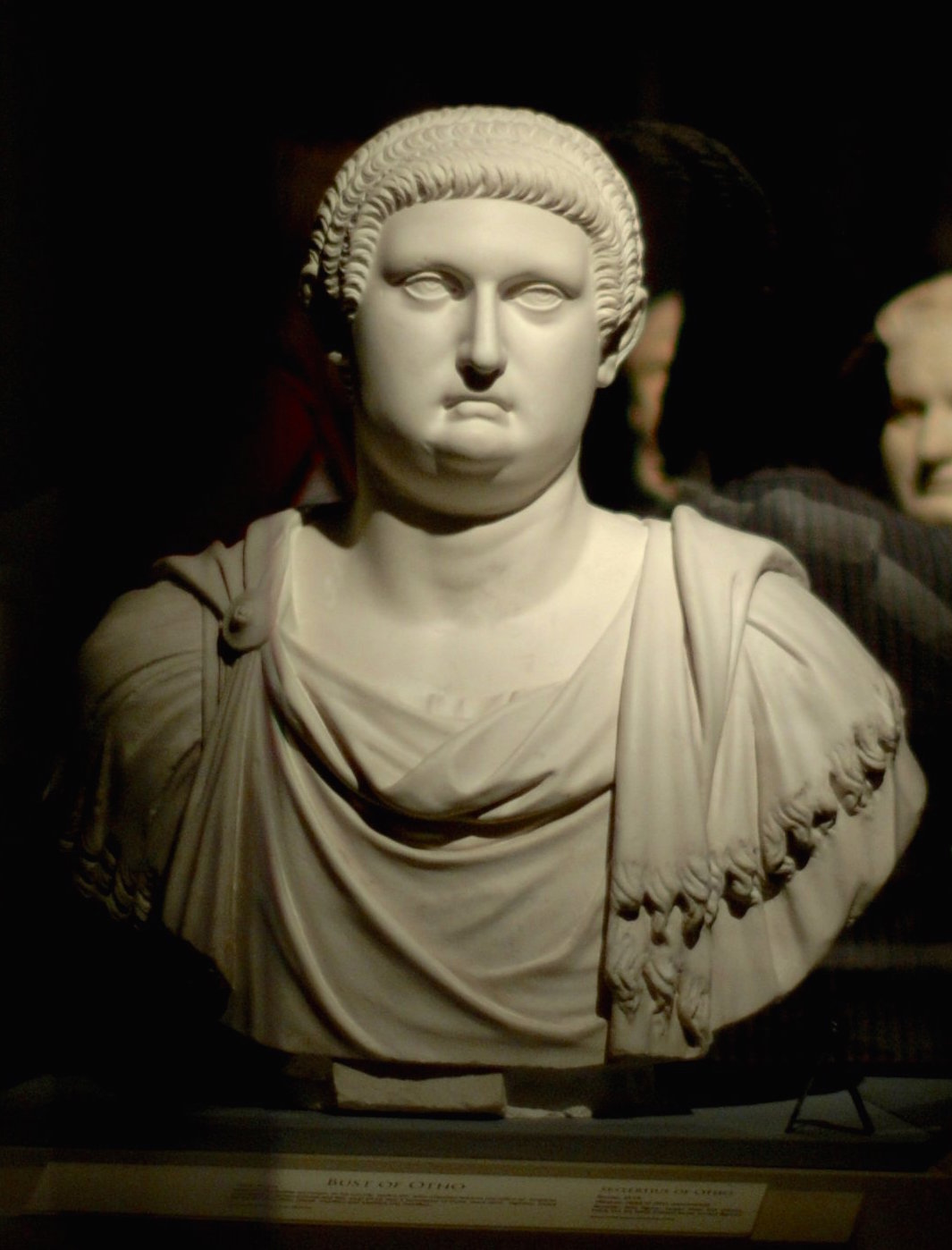
Bust labelled as Otho in the National Archaeological Museum, Florence

On 1 January 69, the day Galba took the office of consul alongside Titus Vinius, the fourth and first Germanica legions of Germania Superior refused to swear loyalty to the emperor. They toppled the statues of Galba and demanded that a new emperor be chosen. On the following day, the soldiers of Germania inferior also refused to swear their loyalty and proclaimed the governor of the province, Aulus Vitellius, as emperor. Galba tried to ensure his authority as emperor was recognized by adopting the nobleman Piso Licinianus as his successor, an action that gained resentment from Otho. Galba was killed by the praetorians on 15 January, followed shortly by Vinius and Piso. Their heads were placed on poles and Otho was proclaimed emperor.

Nero's statues were again set up, his freedmen and household officers reinstalled, including the young castrated boy Sporus whom Nero had taken in marriage and Otho also would live intimately with. The populace acclaimed him as "Nero Otho", although Otho did not appear to like the title.

At the same time, the fears of the more sober and respectable citizens were relieved by Otho's liberal professions of his intention to govern equitably, and by his judicious clemency towards Aulus Marius Celsus, a consul-designate and devoted adherent of Galba. He assumed the consulate of the year alongside his brother Lucius Salvius Otho Titianus, but only until 1 March.

=== War with Vitellius ===
Upon becoming emperor, Otho soon realized that it was much easier to overthrow an emperor than to rule as one. According to Suetonius, Otho once remarked "With long pipes what concern have I?" (referring to undertaking something beyond one's ability to do so). Any further development of Otho's policy was checked once he had read through Galba's private correspondence and realized the extent of the revolution in Germania, where several legions had declared for Vitellius and were already advancing upon Italy.

The conflict began in earnest when Vitellius's forces under Aulus Caecina Alienus and Fabius Valens crossed the Alps into northern Italy. Otho dispatched forces from Pannonia and Dalmatia, including veteran legions such as the Legio XIV Gemina, which had distinguished itself in the suppression of Boudica's revolt in Britain.

The decisive engagement occurred at the Battle of Bedriacum on 14 April 69 AD, approximately 35 kilometers from Cremona. Despite initial successes by some Othonian units, including the capture of a Vitellian eagle standard, the battle resulted in a decisive defeat for Otho's forces. The Praetorian Guard, core of Otho's military strength, performed poorly in the engagement, fleeing before engaging in close combat.

Following the defeat, Otho's remaining forces retreated to their camp at Bedriacum. Despite the urging of his soldiers to continue the fight and the approach of reinforcements from the Balkans, Otho chose to end the civil war rather than subject the Roman people to further bloodshed. On 16 April 69 AD, one day after the battle, Otho committed suicide by stabbing himself with a dagger, stating that he could "die more honourably than he could reign." His death ended the war and cleared the path for Vitellius to assume undisputed control of the empire.

=== Death ===
Otho was still in command of a formidable force as the Dalmatian legions had reached Aquileia and the spirit of his soldiers and their officers was unbroken. He was resolved to accept the verdict of the battle that his own impatience had hastened. In a speech, he bade farewell to those about him, declaring: "It is far more just to perish one for all, than many for one", and then retiring to rest soundly for some hours. Early in the morning he stabbed himself in the heart with a dagger, which he had concealed under his pillow, and died as his attendants entered the tent.

Otho had reigned three months; his ashes were placed within a modest monument and funeral was celebrated at once as he had wished. A plain tomb was erected in his honour at Brixellum, with the inscription Diis Manibus Marci Othonis. His 91-day reign was the shortest until that of Pertinax, whose reign lasted 87 days in 193 during the Year of the Five Emperors. (Note: Cassius Dio 63.15: "He had lived thirty-seven years, lacking eleven days, and had reigned ninety days". This seems to give 15 April as Otho's date of death, yet "thirty-seven years lacking eleven days" actually gives 16 April. (Note: According to Dio, Augustus died after a rule of "forty-four years lacking thirteen days". If we subtract 13 days to 2 September, we have 20 August. The very same chapter precisely dates Augustus' death on "the nineteenth day of August". BUT August might have had only 30 days in the year AD 14 and February had 29 except on leap years, when Feb. had 30. Soon after Augustus' death, one day was taken from Feb. and added to August to honor him. If that is correct, Dio's math and calculus is correct. Still see other errors: Caligula ascended to the throne at "twenty-five years of age, lacking five months and four days". This gives us 27 March; Dio (wrongly) dates Tiberius' death on 26 March. Therefore, Otho died on 16 April, not 17, as the calculation may suggest.) This can be explained by placing Otho's ascension on 16 January. Other historians give similar dates.)

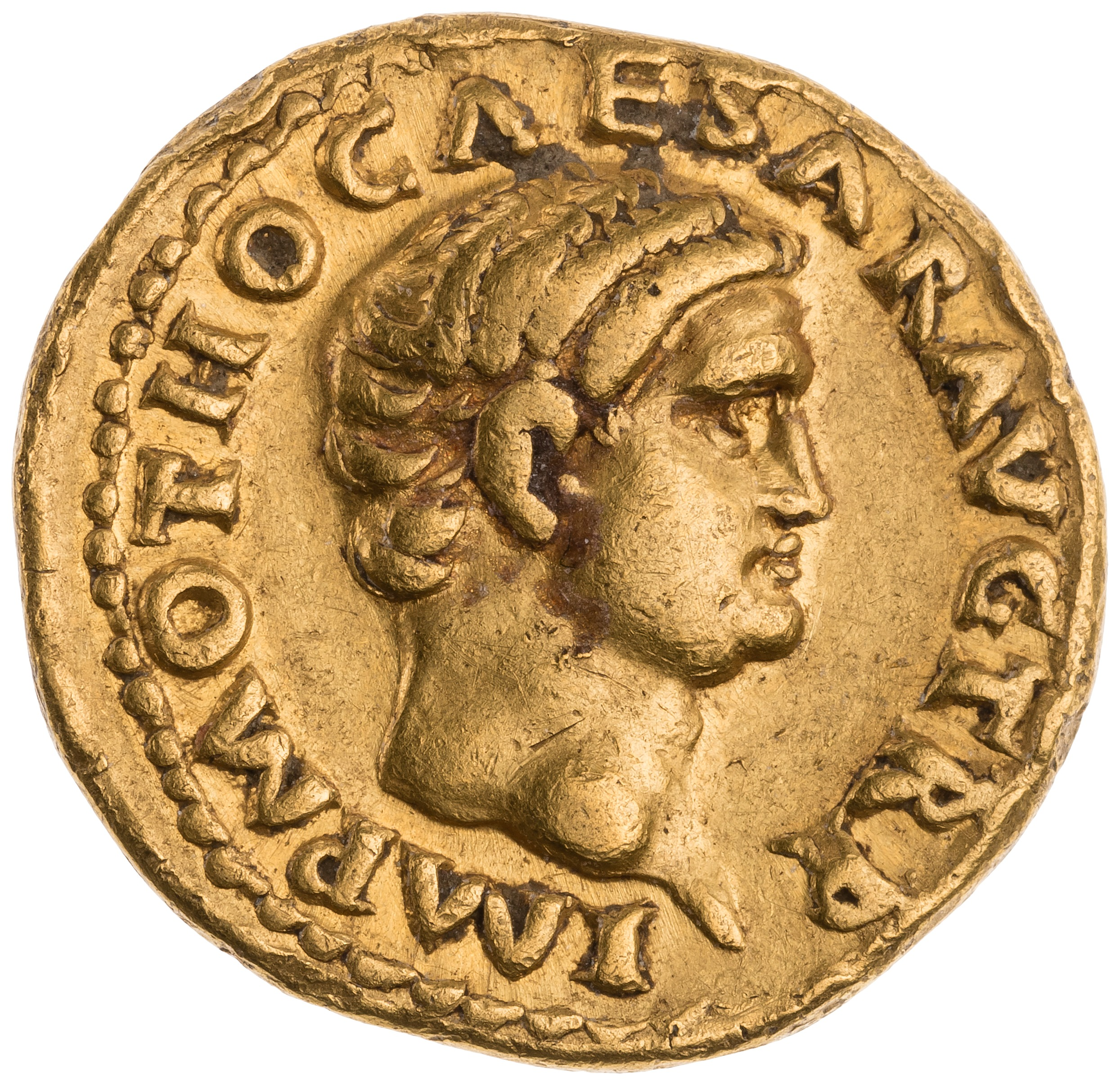
Aureus of Otho. Legend: imp m otho caes aug tr p

It has been thought that Otho's suicide was committed to steer his country away from the path to civil war and to avoid casualties in his legions. Just as he had come to power, many Romans learned to respect Otho in his death. Few could believe that a renowned former companion of Nero had chosen such an honourable end. Tacitus wrote that some of the soldiers committed suicide beside his funeral pyre "because they loved their emperor and wished to share his glory". Writing during the reign of the Emperor Domitian (81–96 AD), the Roman poet Martial expressed his admiration for Otho's choice to spare the empire from civil war through sacrificing himself,

Although the goddess of civil warfare was still in doubt,
And soft Otho had perhaps still a chance of winning,
He renounced fighting that would have cost much blood,
And with sure hand pierced right through his breast.
By all means let Cato in his life be greater than Caesar himself;
In his death was he greater than Otho?

== Cultural references ==
=== In opera ===
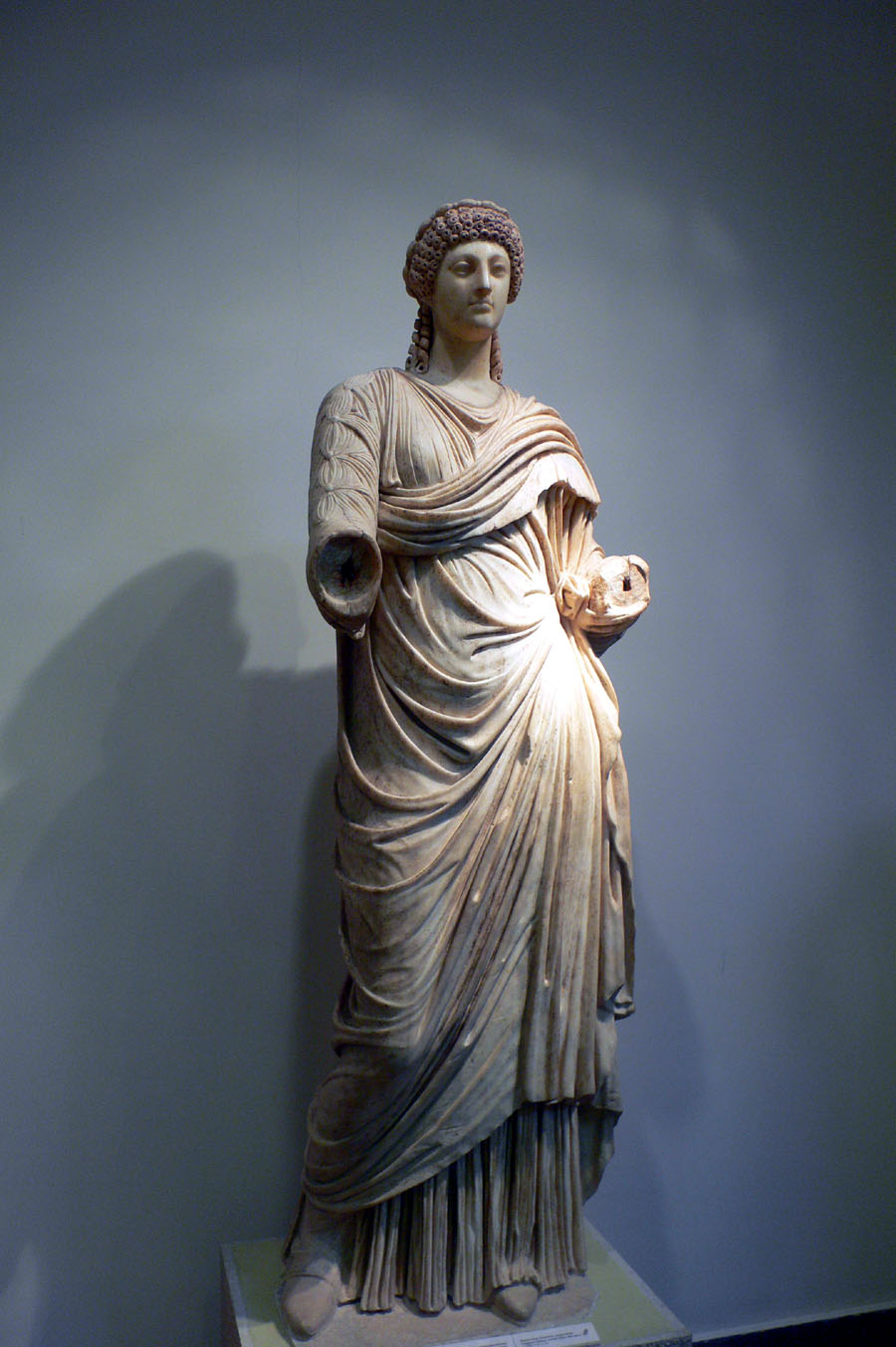
Statue of Poppaea Sabina, Archaeological Museum of Olympia, Greece

- Otho (or Ottone) is a character in L'incoronazione di Poppea (The Coronation of Poppaea), an Italian opera from 1643 by Claudio Monteverdi. Otho is in love with Poppaea but she spurns him. After learning Nero plans to leave her and marry Poppaea, Empress Ottavia orders Otho to kill Poppaea, which he attempts but finds he cannot carry out. He ends the opera in exile with Drusilla, a lady of the court who loves him.
- Otho is a principal character also in Handel's opera Agrippina of 1709. Agrippina, Nero's mother, is intent on promoting her son's claim to the throne. Poppaea, the ingenue, is portrayed as the object of desire of Claudius, Nero, and Otho, whose rivalries Agrippina attempts to leverage to her advantage. Once Poppaea sees through Agrippina's deceit, she responds in kind, but only in order to be united with Otho, portrayed as her one true love.
- Otho (or Ottone) is the title character in Vivaldi's opera Ottone in villa of 1713. Ottone is in love with Cleonilla, who can't resist flirting with two young Romans, Ostilio and Caio. Ostilio is in reality a woman, Tullia, who disguised herself because she's in love with Caio.

=== In literature ===
- Otho is a secondary character in the historical fiction novel Daughters of Rome by Kate Quinn. The book depicts the Year of the Four Emperors. Otho is portrayed as scheming but also charming. His suicide at the end of the portion of the book dedicated to his reign is depicted as a noble sacrifice.

=== In film ===
- There have been multiple recorded versions of L'incoronazione di Poppea. The first was in 1979, a version with the Zurich Opera, and Otho was played by Paul Esswood. In the 2008 production Glyndebourne production, Otho is portrayed by Iestyn Davies. In the 2010 production at the Teatro Real in Madrid, released on DVD in 2012, Max Emanuel Cencic plays Otho.
- In the 2013 Polish film Imperator, done entirely in Latin, Otho is a main character and is portrayed by Robert Wrzosek.

== Sources ==
- This article incorporates text from a publication now in the public domain: Chisholm, Hugh, ed. (1911). "Otho, Marcus Salvius". Encyclopædia Britannica. Vol. 20 (11th ed.). Cambridge University Press. pp. 365–366.
- Champlin, Edward (2005). Nero. Harvard University Press. pp. 147–148. ISBN 978-0-674-01822-8.
- Cooley, Alison E. (2012). The Cambridge Manual of Latin Epigraphy. Cambridge University Press. ISBN 978-0-521-84026-2.
- Donahue, John (7 August 1999). "Galba". De Imperatoribus Romanis. Archived from the original on 11 March 2022.
- Otho (69 A.D.) in De Imperatoribus Romanis.
- Grant, Michael (2002). The twelve Caesars. London: Phoenix Press. ISBN 9781842126370.
- Greenhalgh, P. A. L. (1975). The Year of the Four Emperors. London: Weidenfeld and Nicolson. ISBN 9780297768760.
- Smith, William (1849). Dictionary of Greek and Roman biography and mythology. Vol. 3. C. C. Little and J. Brown; [etc., etc. ]. pp. 897, 2012. LCCN 07038839.

Political offices
Preceded by Galba	Roman emperor 69	Succeeded by Vitellius
Preceded by Galba; Titus Vinius	Roman consul 69 (suffect); With: L. Salvius Otho Titianus	Succeeded by L. Verginius Rufus; L. Pompeius Vopiscus as suffect consuls
