= Juvenal =

Early 2nd century Roman poet

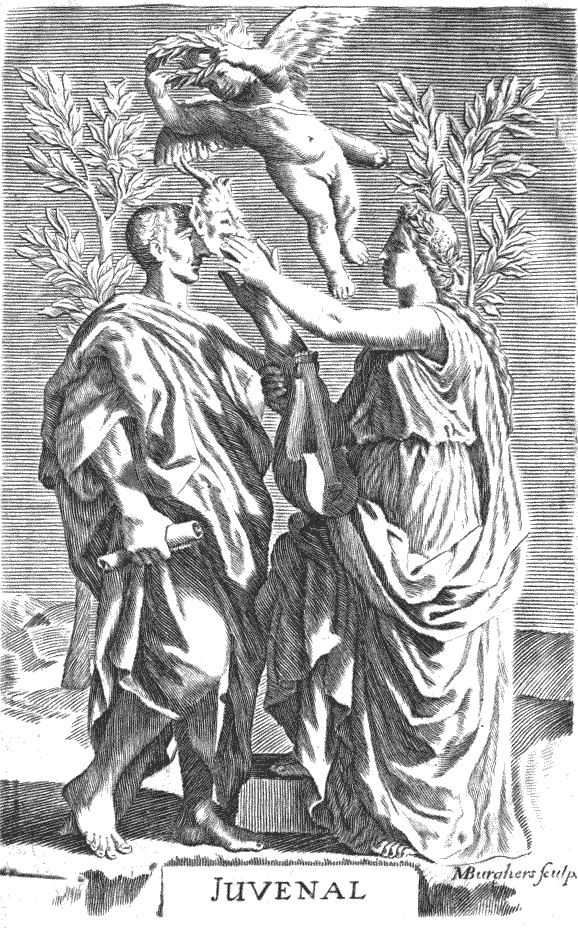
- Frontispiece from John Dryden, The; Satires of Decimus Junius Juvenalis and of Aulus Persius Flaccus
- Born: c. AD 55; Aquinum, Italy, Roman Empire
- Died: 128 (aged c. 73)
- Occupation: Poet
- Writing career
- Genre: Satire

Decimus Junius Juvenalis (Latin: [ˈdɛkɪmʊs ˈjuːniʊs jʊwɛˈnaːlɪs]), known in English as Juvenal (/ˈdʒuːvənəl/ JOO-vən-əl; c. AD 55–128), was a Roman poet. He is the author of the Satires, a collection of satirical poems. The details of Juvenal's life are unclear, but references in his works to people from the late first and early second centuries suggest that he began writing no earlier than that time. One recent scholar argues that his first book was published in 100 or 101. A reference to a political figure dates his fifth and final surviving book to sometime after 127.

Juvenal wrote at least 16 poems in the verse form dactylic hexameter. These poems cover a range of Roman topics. This follows Lucilius—the originator of the Roman satire genre, and it fits within a poetic tradition that also includes Horace and Persius. The Satires are a vital source for the study of ancient Rome from a number of perspectives, although their comic mode of expression makes it problematic to accept the content as strictly factual. At first glance the Satires could be read as a critique of Rome.

== Life ==
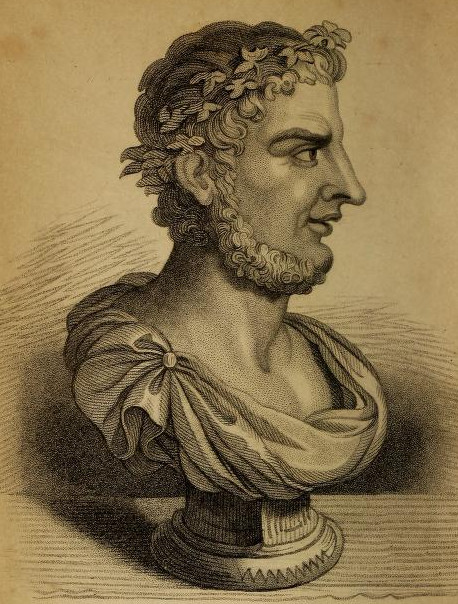
Juvenal, S. H. Gimber, 1837

Details of the author's life cannot be reconstructed definitively. The Vita Iuvenalis (Life of Juvenal), a biography of the author that became associated with his manuscripts no later than the tenth century, is little more than an extrapolation from the Satires.

Traditional biographies, including the Vita Iuvenalis, give us the writer's full name and also tell us that he was either the son, or adopted son, of a rich freedman. He is supposed to have been a pupil of Quintilian, and to have practiced rhetoric until he was middle-aged, both as amusement and for legal purposes. The Satires do make frequent and accurate references to the operation of the Roman legal system, which adds credibility to his having studied law. His career as a satirist is supposed to have begun at a fairly late stage in his life, possibly by a lack of income in his study of law. The Vita Iuvenalis also states that he was incredibly poor, which is further reinforced by Martial calling him 'a poor dependent cadging from rich men'.

Biographies agree in giving his birthplace as the Volscian town of Aquinum and in allotting to his life a period of exile, which supposedly was due to his insulting an actor who had high levels of court influence – possibly the actor Paris, whom he slandered in his 7th Satire. The emperor who banished him was Trajan or Domitian. A preponderance of the biographies place his exile in Egypt, with the exception of one that opts for Scotland.

Only one of these traditional biographies supplies a date of birth for Juvenal: it gives AD 55, which most probably is speculation, but accords reasonably well with the rest of the evidence. Other traditions have him surviving for some time past Hadrian's death in 138. Some sources place his death in exile, others have him being recalled to Rome (the latter of which is considered more plausible by contemporary scholars). If he was exiled by Domitian, then it is possible that he was one of the political exiles recalled during the brief reign of Nerva.

It is impossible to tell how much of the content of these traditional biographies is fiction and how much is fact. Large parts clearly are mere deduction from Juvenal's writings, but some elements appear more substantial. Juvenal never mentions a period of exile in his life, yet it appears in every extant traditional biography. Many scholars think the idea of his exile to be a later invention, made up to show how much his works offended others. However the Satires do display some knowledge of Egypt and Britain, and it is thought that this gave rise to the tradition that Juvenal was exiled. Others, however—particularly Gilbert Highet—regard the exile as factual, and these scholars also supply a concrete date for the exile: 93 to 96, when Nerva became emperor. They argue that a reference to Juvenal in one of Martial's poems, which is dated to 92, is impossible if, at this stage Juvenal was already in exile, or, had served his time in exile, since in that case, Martial would not have wished to antagonize Domitian by mentioning such a persona non grata as Juvenal. If Juvenal was exiled, he would have lost his patrimony, and this may explain the consistent descriptions of the life of the client he bemoans in the Satires.

The only other biographical evidence available is a dedicatory inscription said to have been found at Aquinum in the nineteenth century, which consists of the following text:

...]RI·SACRVM
...]NIVS·IVVENALIS
...] COH·[.]·DELMATARVM
II·VIR·QVINQ·FLAMEN
DIVI·VESPASIANI
VOVIT·DEDICAV[...]UE
SVA PEC

[CERE]RI·SACRVM
[D(ECIMVS) IV]NIVS·IVVENALIS
[TRIB(VNVS)] COH(ORTIS)·[I]·DELMATARVM
II·VIR·QVINQ(VENNALIS)·FLAMEN
DIVI·VESPASIANI
VOVIT·DEDICAV[ITQ]VE
SVA PEC(VNIA)

To Ceres (this) sacred (thing)
(Decimus Junius?) Juvenalis
military tribune of the first cohort of the Dalmatian (legions)
Duovir, Quinquennalis, Flamen
of the Divine Vespasian
vowed and dedicated
at his own expense
(Corpus Inscriptionum Latinarum X.5382)

Scholars usually are of the opinion that this inscription does not relate to the poet: a military career would not fit well with the pronounced anti-militarism of the Satires and, moreover, the Dalmatian legions do not seem to have existed prior to AD 166. Therefore, it seems likely that this reference is to a Juvenal who was a later relative of the poet, however, as they both came from Aquinum and were associated with the goddess Ceres (the only deity the Satires shows much respect for). If the theory that connects these two Juvenals is correct, then the inscription does show that Juvenal's family was reasonably wealthy, and that, if the poet really was the son of a foreign freedman, then his descendants assimilated into the Roman class structure more quickly than typical. Green thinks it's more likely that the tradition of the freedman father is false, and that Juvenal's ancestors had been minor nobility of Roman Italy of relatively ancient descent.

== See also ==
- Glossarium Eroticum
- Junia (gens)
- Panem et circenses
- Satires (Juvenal)
- Satire VI
