= Sextus Palpellius Hister =

1st century AD Roman senator, consul and general

Sextus Palpellius Hister was a Roman senator and general who was active during the Principate. He was suffect consul in the nundinium of March-July 43 with Lucius Pedanius Secundus as his colleague.

An inscription from Pietas Julia in Istria, erected by one Gaius Precius Felix Napolitanus, provides us many details of his cursus honorum, although not in chronological order. Hister began his career as one of the decemviri stlitibus judicandis, one of the four boards that form the vigintiviri; membership in one of these four boards was a preliminary and required first step toward gaining entry into the Roman Senate. His next documented office was military tribune of Legio XIV Gemina, at the time stationed at Moguntiacum in Germania Superior. Of the traditional Republican cursus, only the offices of plebeian tribune and praetor are recorded in this inscription, but one can assume that he had also been quaestor. The inscription also attests he was a legatus, which could mean either that he was a governor of an imperial province, or had been a commander of a Roman legion) and governor of a public province. While Hister was a praetor, he also achieved the honor of being a comites or companion of the emperor Claudius.

One office Hister held not specifically named in the Istrian inscription was governor of the imperial province of Pannonia; Tacitus is our source for this fact. While the translation of Alfred John Church and William Jackson Brodribb call this governor "P. Atellius Hister", editions of Tacitus more recent than that used by Church and Brodribb call him "Palpellius Hister". Further, P. Atellius Hister is not otherwise attested. Tacitus attests that Palpellius Hister held this post in the year 50, when Vannius, king of the Quadi, was driven from his throne and kingdom by Vibilius, king of the Hermunduri, and two sons of Vannius' sister, Vangio and Sido. Although the emperor Claudius declined to intervene in this conflict, he gave orders to Hister to have his legions and some picked Auxiliaries encamped on the banks of the Danube "as a support to the conquered and a terror to the conqueror, who might otherwise, in the elation of success, disturb the peace of our empire."

Political offices
Preceded by Claudius III, and Lucius Vitellius II as Ordinary consuls	Suffect consul of the Roman Empire; 43 with Lucius Pedanius Secundus	Succeeded by Aulus Gabinius Secundus, and ignotus as Suffect consuls
