= Publius Marius =

1st century AD Roman senator and ordinary consul

Publius Marius P. f. was a Roman senator and ordinary consul in 62 AD with Lucius Afinius Gallus as his colleague. Although Frontinus records that Marius was appointed curator aquarum in 64, we know nothing more about him.

George Houston points out that this consul had no attested cognomen, and "Celsus" was added based on a preliminary reading of a wax table from Pompeii, CIL IV, 3340.151.

Prior to Marius' consulate, eight of the ten ordinary consuls had come from consular families; half of them could trace their ancestry to men who had held the consulate during the Roman Republic. Judith Ginsburg argues that Nero, who had been influenced by his praetorian prefect Sextus Afranius Burrus and his tutor Seneca the Younger, had moved away from a policy of appeasing members of these consular families and now appointed men who were noted for "friendship, service and loyalty". If she is correct, this is the only clue we have to his personality.

Political offices
Preceded by Gnaeus Pedanius Fuscus Salinator, and Lucius Velleius Paterculus as Suffect consuls	Consul of the Roman Empire; 62 with Lucius Afinius Gallus	Succeeded by Quintus Manlius Ancharius Tarquitius Saturninus, and Publius Petronius Niger as Suffect consuls
