= Salvidiena gens =

Family in ancient Rome

The gens Salvidiena was a plebeian family at ancient Rome. Members of this gens are first mentioned toward the end of the Republic, and from then to the end of the second century they regularly filled the highest offices of the Roman state.

== Origin ==
The nomen Salvidienus belongs to a class of gentilicia formed primarily from other gentile names using the suffix -enus. The root is Salvidius, itself presumably formed from the Oscan praenomen Salvius, using the suffix -idius.

== Praenomina ==
The Salvidieni regularly used the praenomina Gaius, Lucius, Marcus, and Quintus, four of the most common names throughout Roman history. At least one branch of the family used the more distinctive Servius, which may have been inherited from the Cornelii; the only members of this gens to bear the name without also bearing the nomen Cornelius were probably related to this family, or descended from its freedmen. A Salvidienus from Samnium bore the praenomen Vibius, which was scarce at Rome, although more common in Oscan-speaking parts of Italy.

== Branches and cognomina ==
The only distinct family of the Salvidieni under the Republic bore the surname Rufus, originally given to someone with red hair, perhaps with the additional surname Salvius, originally an Oscan praenomen, but later a gentile name, and evidently also a cognomen. In its extended form, Salvianus, it appears in the nomenclature of Lucius Salvidienus Rufus, consul in AD 52. The only other distinct family of the Salvidieni claimed descent from the illustrious house of the Cornelii Scipiones, and flourished during the first and second centuries. They more properly belong to the Cornelian gens, although they retained Salvidienus as part of their nomenclature for as long as the family is known from inscriptions.

== Members ==
This list includes abbreviated praenomina. For an explanation of this practice, see filiation.

=== Salvidieni Rufi ===
- Quintus Salvidienus Rufus, (Note: Also found as "Quintus Salvius Rufus".) a close friend and advisor to Octavian, and one of his most trusted generals in the years following the death of Caesar. After fighting against Sextus Pompeius, then Lucius Antonius during the Perusine War, he made overtures to Marcus Antonius, who betrayed Salvidienus to Octavian. Salvidienus was recalled to Rome, and condemned to death.
- Salvidienus Rufus, brother of Octavian's general. He died some time prior to 40 BC, and was buried on the Tiber, and a bridge was built to lead to his tomb.
- Salvidiena Q. f. Rufa, probably the daughter of the general Quintus Salvidienus Rufus, is named in an inscription from Rome, dating from the latter part of the first century BC, or the early first century AD.
- Lucius Salvidienus Rufus Salvianus, probably a descendant of the general Quintus Salvidienus Rufus, was consul suffectus in AD 52.

=== Salvidieni Orfiti ===
- Servius Cornelius Ser. f. Scipio Salvidienus Orfitus, served at various times as quaestor and praetor urbanus, and was consul in AD 51, serving alongside the emperor Claudius. He held several priesthoods, and was governor of Africa in 62 and 63. Nero had him put to death in 66, ostensibly for wrongfully renting three shops attached to his house, but more likely because of a perceived insult.
- Servius Cornelius Ser. f. Ser. n. Salvidienus Orfitus, one of several former consuls put to death by Domitian, on the charge of plotting revolution.
- Servius Cornelius Ser. f. Ser. n. Scipio Salvidienus Orfitus, consul in AD 110, when he must have been a young man; he was praefectus urbi in the reign of Antoninus Pius.
- Lucius Sergius Salvidienus Scipio Orfitus, consul in AD 149.
- Servius Cornelius Ser. f. Ser. n. Scipio Salvidienus Orfitus, consul in an uncertain year, and governor of Africa from AD 163 to 164.
- Servius Cornelius (Ser. f. Ser. n.) Scipio Salvidienus Orfitus, consul in AD 178.
- Servius Cornelius (Ser. f. Ser. n.) Scipio Salvidienus Orfitus, one of the Salii Palatini in AD 189 and 190.

=== Others ===
- Gaius Salvidienus Augustalis, built a first-century tomb at Rome for his son, Gaius Salvidienus Lucifer.
- Gaius Salvidienus C. f. Lucifer, buried at Rome, in a first-century tomb built by his father, Gaius Salvidienus Augustalis, and wife, Salvidiena Helpis.
- Salvidiena Helpis, dedicated a first-century tomb at Rome to her husband, Gaius Salvidienus Lucifer.
- Gaius Salvidienus Primigenius, a soldier stationed at Rome in AD 70, serving in the century of Tiberius Claudius Nicia.
- Marcus Salvidienus Asprenas, proconsul of Bithynia during the reign of Vespasian, minted various coins under the Flavian emperors.
- Marcus Salvidienus Proculus, governor of Bithynia under Vespasian, and a moneyer under the Flavians, might be the same person as Asprenas, or perhaps his brother.
- Marcus Salvidienus, governor of Judaea from AD 80 to 85.
- Salvidiena Musa, named in a second-century inscription from Rome, together with Gaius Salvidienus Priscus and Gaius Salvidienus Jucundus.
- Gaius Salvidienus Priscus, named in a second-century inscription from Rome, together with Salvidiena Musa and Gaius Salvidienus Jucundus.
- Gaius Salvidienus Jucundus, named in a second-century inscription from Rome, together with Salvidiena Musa and Gaius Salvidienus Priscus.
- Marcus Salvidienus, one of the sources of Vopiscus for the life of the usurper Saturninus. Salvidienus reported that the speech attributed to Saturninus at Alexandria had been written by the general himself, as he was a man of some learning and rhetorical skill.

=== Undated Salvidieni ===
- Salvidiena, the mistress of Salvidienus Polydorus, a slave buried at Puteoli in Campania.
- Cara Salvidiena, probably the wife of Lucius Vibius Crescens, a veteran of the fourth cohort of the Praetorian Guard buried at Tibur in Latium.
- Lucius L. f. Salvidienus, buried at Rome, aged twenty-two, with a monument from his father, Lucius Salvidienus Secundus.
- Vibius Salvidienus, named in an inscription from Corfinium in Samnium.
- Salvidiena Q. l. Hilara, a freedwoman, who dedicated a tomb at Rome to her daughter, Salvidiena Faustilla, aged fifteen years, three months, eleven days, and seven hours.
- Salvidiena Justa, dedicated a tomb at Rome to her mother, Salvidiena Romana.
- Gaius Salvidienus Lupus, buried at Cirta in Numidia, aged fifteen.
- Salvidienus Maritimis, a soldier buried at Lambaesis in Numidia.
- Salvidiena Paulla, the wife of Marcus Lollius, and mother of Lollia Prisca, a young woman buried at Rome, aged twenty-two years, eight months, and nine days, with a monument from her mother and her husband, Gaius Flavius Furius Pantaenectus.
- Salvidienus Ɔ. s. Polydorus, a slave buried at Puteoli, together with his daughters, Polydora and Marcella.
- Salvidiena Priscilla, buried at Rome with a tomb dedicated by her husband, Alexander, and her son.
- Salvidiena Romana, buried at Rome, in a tomb dedicated by her daughter, Salvidiena Justa.
- Salvidiena Saluta, named in a dedicatory inscription from Rome.
- Lucius Salvidienus Secundus, built a tomb at Rome for his son, Lucius Salvidienus.
- Servius Salvidienus Symphorus, named in an inscription from Rome.
- Marcus Salvidienus Vettianus, a prefect with aedilician powers at Brixia in Venetia and Histria.

== See also ==
- List of Roman gentes

== Bibliography ==
- Titus Livius (Livy), History of Rome.
- Marcus Velleius Paterculus, Compendium of Roman History.
- Gaius Suetonius Tranquillus, De Vita Caesarum (Lives of the Caesars, or The Twelve Caesars).
- Appianus Alexandrinus (Appian), Bellum Civile (The Civil War).
- Lucius Cassius Dio Cocceianus (Cassius Dio), Roman History.
- Aelius Lampridius, Aelius Spartianus, Flavius Vopiscus, Julius Capitolinus, Trebellius Pollio, and Vulcatius Gallicanus, Historia Augusta (Augustan History).
- Dictionary of Greek and Roman Biography and Mythology, William Smith, ed., Little, Brown and Company, Boston (1849).
- Theodor Mommsen et alii, Corpus Inscriptionum Latinarum (The Body of Latin Inscriptions, abbreviated CIL), Berlin-Brandenburgische Akademie der Wissenschaften (1853–present).
- Supplementa Italica (Supplement for Italy), Unione Accademica Nazionale.
- René Cagnat et alii, L'Année épigraphique (The Year in Epigraphy, abbreviated AE), Presses Universitaires de France (1888–present).
- George Davis Chase, "The Origin of Roman Praenomina", in Harvard Studies in Classical Philology, vol. VIII, pp. 103–184 (1897).
- Paul von Rohden, Elimar Klebs, & Hermann Dessau, Prosopographia Imperii Romani (The Prosopography of the Roman Empire, abbreviated PIR), Berlin (1898).
- Joyce M. Reynolds, J. B. Ward-Perkins, The Inscriptions of Roman Tripolitania, British School at Rome (1952).
- T. Robert S. Broughton, The Magistrates of the Roman Republic, American Philological Association (1952–1986).
- E. Mary Smallwood, Documents Illustrating the Principates of Nerva, Trajan, and Hadrian, Cambridge University Press (1966).
- Géza Alföldy, Konsulat und Senatorenstand unter der Antonien (The Consulate and Senatorial State under the Antonines), Rudolf Habelt, Bonn (1977).
- Paul A. Gallivan, "The Fasti for the Reign of Claudius", in Classical Quarterly, vol. 28, pp. 407–426 (1978), "The Fasti for A.D. 70–96", in Classical Quarterly, vol. 31, pp. 186–220 (1981).
- Ivan Di Stefano Manzella, "Zosimo liberto di Q. Salvidieno Rufo e accenso di L. Cornificio console nel 35 A. C." (Zosimus, freedman of Q. Salvidienus Rufus and the accession of consul L. Cornificius in 35 BC.), in Zeitschrift für Papyrologie und Epigraphik, Rudolf Habelt GmbH, vol. 85 (1991).
- Melissa Barden Dowling, Clemency & Cruelty in the Roman World, University of Michigan Press (2006), ISBN 9780472115150.
- Werner Eck, "Die Fasti consulares der Regierungszeit des Antoninus Pius, eine Bestandsaufnahme seit Géza Alföldys Konsulat und Senatorenstand" (The Consular Fasti for the Reign of Antoninus Pius: an Inventory since Géza Alföldy's Konsulat und Senatorenstand), in Studia Epigraphica in Memoriam Géza Alföldy, Werner Eck, Bence Fehér, Péter Kovács, eds., Bonn, pp. 69–90 (2013).
