= Lucius Salvius Otho Titianus =

Roman senator

- Occupation: Senator
- Spouse: Cocceia
- Children: Lucius Salvius Otho Cocceianus
- Parents: Lucius Salvius Otho (father); Albia Terentia (mother)
- Relatives: Otho

Lucius Salvius Otho Titianus was the elder brother of the Roman emperor Otho (r. 69 AD). As a Roman senator, he was consul in the year 52 as the colleague of Faustus Cornelius Sulla Felix, and appointed consul as his brother's colleague for the period from Galba's murder to the end of February. When Otho left Rome to halt the advance of Vitellius into Italy, he put the daily imperial responsibilities in the hands of Titianus. Subsequently, Titianus was appointed generalissimo in charge of the war by Otho and was present at the First Battle of Bedriacum.

Titianus was a member of the Arval Brethren, serving as promagistrate at least five times beginning in the year 57 into the year 69. The sortition awarded him the proconsular governorship of Asia for the term 63/64.

== Family ==
Titianus was married to Cocceia, sister of the future Emperor Nerva (reigned 96–98), with whom he had a son, Lucius Salvius Otho Cocceianus. Cocceianus rose to become consul around 80, but was later executed under orders of Emperor Domitian, for having observed his uncle Otho's birthday.

Political offices
Preceded by Claudius V Titus Flavius Vespasianus	Roman consul 52 with Faustus Cornelius Sulla Felix	Succeeded by Quintus Marcius Barea Soranus as suffect consul
Preceded by Galba II; Titus Vinius	Roman consul 69 with Otho	Succeeded by Lucius Verginius Rufus II; Lucius Pompeius Vopiscus
