= Gnaeus Pedanius Fuscus Salinator (consul 118) =

2nd century Roman senator and lawyer

Gnaeus Pedanius Fuscus Salinator was a Roman senator and lawyer. He served as ordinary consul for the year 118 AD as the colleague of the Emperor Hadrian. Salinator was a member of the circle of friends and peers around Pliny the Younger.

Salinator was a member of the Pedanii, who had their roots as Roman colonists in the town of Barcino in Tarraconensis. Salinator himself was the son of Gnaeus Pedanius Fuscus Salinator, suffect consul in either the year 83 or 84.

Pliny addresses three letters to Salinator (whom he calls Pedanius Fuscus), and mentions him in three more. However, the three letters Pliny wrote him are on trivial matters: one contains advice to Salinator about how to study—although Pliny notes Salinator's "particular interest is pleading"; the other two are essays wherein Pliny describes his daily schedule. The other letters mentioning him to third parties provide us more information about Salinator. One concerns Salinator's debut speech in the Senate, where he was opposed by another young Senator also delivering his debut speech, Ummidius Quadratus. Another, addressed to Lucius Julius Ursus Servianus, congratulates Servianus on the betrothal of his daughter to Salinator. Ronald Syme supplies a name for her: Julia, the daughter of Hadrian's sister Domitia Paulina.

As for Salinator's senatorial career, we know few details. Pliny's third letter mentioning him is a letter for recommendation for one Nymphidius Lupus, written to the emperor Trajan in the year 110. In this letter he writes that "Fuscus Salinator" has also recommended Lupus in a manner to imply that Salinator was a governor at some time before 110. Over which province he was governor is not stated in the letter, but the consensus of the experts is that it was likely Moesia Inferior. He may be the subject of a mutilated inscription recovered from Durostorum; the tenure of this unknown senator has been dated by Werner Eck from the year 108 to the year 110.

After he completed his term as ordinary consul, Salinator vanishes from recorded history, which is surprising. "The consular Fasti in the early season of Hadrian's reign duly disclose several of his allies," Syme writes. As Hadrian's colleague in his first consulate as emperor, Pedianus Fuscus Salinator would occupy a very prominent position in Hadrian's list of appointees. One would expect to hear more of Salinator, yet as Syme notes, he is "only a name in the Fasti". While his disappearance could be attributed to falling out of favor with Hadrian—the emperor is known to have executed four men thought to have been a threat to him (Avidius Nigrinus, Cornelius Palma, Calpurnius Piso Licinianus and Lusius Quietus) -- Syme suggests that Salinator and his wife simply succumbed to "a malady or a pestilence soon after 118."

Salinator is known to have had a son by Julia, the daughter of Servianus, named Lucius Pedanius Fuscus Salinator. This son, along with his grandfather Servianus, were accused of being involved in a plot against Hadrian; as a result both men were forced to commit suicide shortly before Hadrian's death.

Political offices
Preceded by ignotus, and Gnaeus Minicius Faustinus as Suffect consuls	Consul of the Roman Empire; 118 with Hadrian II	Succeeded by Lucius Pompeius Bassus, and Bellicius Tebanianus as Suffect consuls
