= Lucius Afinius Gallus =

1st century AD Roman senator and consul

Afinius Gallus
- Occupation: Politician
- Known for: Consul of the Roman Empire

Lucius Afinius Gallus was a consul of the Roman Empire in the year 62 as the colleague of Publius Marius.

Political offices
Preceded by Gnaeus Pedanius Fuscus Salinator, and Lucius Velleius Paterculus as Suffect consuls	Consul of the Roman Empire; 62 with Publius Marius	Succeeded by Quintus Manlius Ancharius Tarquitius Saturninus, and Publius Petronius Niger as Suffect consuls
