= Quintus =

Male given name

- Pronunciation: /ˈkwɪntəs/
- Gender: Male

Origin
- Language: Latin
- Origin: Quintus
- Derivation: quintus, meaning "fifth"
- Meaning: "fifth"

Other names
- Short form: Quint

Quintus is a male given name derived from Quintus, a common Latin forename (praenomen) found in the culture of ancient Rome. Quintus derives from Latin word quintus, meaning "fifth".

In modern times, it also functions as a rare surname, primarily found in parts of Central and Western Europe.

== In other languages ==
Corsican
Quintu
Croatian
Kvint
French
Quint
Finnish

Qvintus

German
Quint, Quintus
Greek
Κόιντος (Kóintos)
Spanish
Quinto
Italian
Quinto
Polish
Kwintus
Portuguese
Quinto
Russian
Квинт (Kvint)
Serbian
Kvint
Slovene
Kvint

== Derived surnames ==
Greek	Κοϊντόσης (Koïntósis)
Spanish	Quintana, Quintero, Quintos, Quintilliano
Catalan	Quintí, Quintos
Italian	Quintos, Quintiliano

== Notable people ==
=== Modern given name ===
- Lucius Quintus Cincinnatus Lamar I (1797–1834), American judge
- Lucius Quintus Cincinnatus Lamar (1825–1893), US Supreme Court justice from 1888 to 1893
- Quintus McDonald (born 1966), American football player
- Quintus Quincy Quigley (1828–1910), American lawyer
- Quintus et Ultimus Watson (1874–1929), American politician

=== Roman given name ===
- Quintus Antistius Adventus, 2nd century Roman politician and general
- Quintus Fabius Maximus Aemilianus, Roman statesman and consul
- Quintus Lucretius Afella, Roman general
- Quintus Glitius Atilius Agricola, Late 1st/early 2nd century Roman senator, consul and general
- Quintus Servilius Ahala, 4th-century BC Roman general and statesman
- Quintus Fabius Maximus Allobrogicus, 2nd-century BC Roman statesman and general
- Quintus Fabius Ambustus (tribune), Early 4th-century BC Roman politician and soldier
- Quintus Fabius Ambustus (dictator), Ancient Roman dictator
- Quintus Ancharius (killed by Marius), Ancient Roman senator
- Quintus Cornelius Senecio Annianus, 2nd century Roman senator, consul and governor
- Quintus Coredius Gallus Gargilius Antiquus, 2nd century Roman senator and consul
- Quintus Haterius Antoninus, Roman consul 53 AD
- Quintus Atrius, Roman military officer
- Quintus Hedius Lollianus Plautius Avitus, Late 2nd/early 3rd century Roman senator and consul
- Quintus Antonius Balbus, Ancient Roman politician
- Quintus Lucilius Balbus, 1st-century BC Roman philosopher
- Quintus Caecilius Metellus Balearicus, 2nd-century BCE Roman statesman and general
- Quintus Aemilius Barbula, 4th-century BC Roman senator and general
- Quintus Caecilius Bassus (fl. 1st century BC), Roman equestrian
- Quintus Servilius Caepio (consul 106 BC), Ancient Roman general and statesman
- Quintus Servilius Caepio (quaestor 103 BC) (died 90 BC), Roman patrician, statesman and soldier
- Quintus Servilius Caepio (adoptive father of Brutus), Roman aristocrat
- Quintus Servilius Caepio (consul 140 BC), Roman statesman
- Quintus Fufius Calenus, Roman politician and general who was consul in 47 and tribune in 61 BC
- Quintus Sulpicius Camerinus, Roman senator and poet who served as consul in AD 9
- Quintus Lutatius Catulus Capitolinus, Senator of the Roman Republic
- Quintus Lutatius Catulus (consul 102 BC) (149–87 BC), Roman politician and general
- Quintus Caecilius Metellus Celer, Roman consul in 60 BC and opponent of Pompey and Caesar
- Quintus Lutatius Cerco (died 236 BC), Roman politician
- Quintus Petillius Cerialis, 1st century AD Roman general, consul and administrator
- Quintus Aulius Cerretanus, 4th-century BC Roman consul and general
- Quintus Tullius Cicero, 1st Century BC Roman politician and general
- Quintus Quinctius Cincinnatus (consular tribune 415 BC), 5th century BC Roman Republican consular tribune
- Quintus Tineius Clemens, Late 2nd century Roman senator and consul
- Quintus Tineius Sacerdos Clemens, 2nd century Roman senator and consul
- Quintus Julius Cordus, 1st century Roman politician, suffect consul and governor
- Quintus Volusius Flaccus Cornelianus, 2nd century Roman senator and consul
- Quintus Fuficius Cornutus, 2nd century Roman senator, consul and governor
- Quintus Sulpicius Camerinus Cornutus (consular tribune), Roman consular tribune in 402 BC and 398 BC
- Quintus Sulpicius Camerinus Cornutus (consul), 5th century BC Roman senator and consul
- Quintus Caecilius Metellus Creticus (c. 114 BC – late 50s BC), Roman statesman, general, consul, and conqueror of Crete
- Quintus Marcius Crispus, 1st century BC Roman senator and military officer
- Quintus Tineius Demetrius, Roman governor of Egypt from 189 to 190
- Quintus Didius, Roman governor of the province of Syria
- Quintus Laberius Durus, 1st-century Roman military tribune
- Quintus Fabius Maximus Eburnus, 2nd-century BC Roman statesman and consul
- Quintus Minucius Esquilinus, 5th-century BC Roman politician and general
- Quintus Pompeius Falco, 2nd century Roman senator, governor and general
- Quintus Pompeius Sosius Falco, Late 2nd century Roman senator and consul
- Quintus Valerius Falto, Roman statesman and general, Victor of the Aegates
- Quintus Anicius Faustus, Late 2nd / early 3rd century Roman military officer and senator
- Quintus Servilius Fidenas, 4th-century BC Roman politician and consular tribune
- Quintus Servilius Priscus Fidenas, 5th century BC Roman senator, dictator and general
- Quintus Aurelius Pactumeius Fronto, 1st century Roman senator and first consul from North Africa
- Quintus Julius Cordinus Gaius Rutilius Gallicus, 1st century Roman senator, consul and governor
- Quintus Ogulnius Gallus, Ancient Roman politician
- Quintus Fabius Maximus Gurges (consul 292 BC), 3rd-century BC Roman statesman and general
- Quintus Fabius Maximus Gurges (consul 265 BC), Roman statesman and general
- Quintus Ninnius Hasta, Roman senator
- Quintus Haterius (c.63 BC-AD 26), Roman politician and orator during the reigns of Augustus and Tiberius
- Quintus Caelius Honoratus, Late 1st/early 2nd century Roman senator and consul
- Quintus Hortensius (114–50 BC), Roman lawyer, orator and statesman
- Quintus Antonius Isauricus, 2nd century military commander and suffect consul
- Quintus Camurius Numisius Junior, 2nd century Roman senator, consul and legate
- Quintus Labienus, 1st-century BCE Roman general
- Quintus Aemilius Laetus (died 193), Praetorian Guard prefect
- Quintus Maecius Laetus, Roman eques
- Quintus Aemilius Lepidus, Roman consul 21 BC
- Quintus Caecilius Metellus Macedonicus (c. 188 –116/5 BC), Roman general and statesman
- Quintus Baebius Macer, 2nd century Roman senator and official
- Quintus Gargilius Martialis, Roman writer
- Quintus Rammius Martialis, Roman state official
- Quintus Flavius Maesius Egnatius Lollianus Mavortius, Roman senator
- Quintus Fabius Maximus (consul 45 BC), Ancient Roman statesman and general
- Quintus Fabius Maximus (consul 213 BC), Roman consul in 213 BC
- Quintus Sanquinius Maximus, 1st century AD Roman senator, consul, urban prefect and provincial governor
- Quintus Antonius Merenda, Roman consular tribune in 422 BC
- Quintus Caecilius Metellus (consul 206 BC) (250 BC - 175 BC), Roman consul
- Quintus Licinius Modestinus, 2nd century Roman senator and consul
- Quintus Nasidius, 1st century Roman naval commander
- Quintus Caecilius Metellus Nepos (consul 57 BC), 1st century BC Roman politician
- Quintus Caecilius Metellus Nepos (consul 98 BC), Ancient Roman nobleman and politician
- Quintus Fulvius Nobilior, Roman consul
- Quintus Caedicius Noctua, Roman consul in 289 BC
- Quintus Novius, Roman dramatist
- Quintus Caecilius Metellus Numidicus, Ancient Roman statesman and general
- Quintus Opimius (consul), 2nd century BC Roman politician
- Quintus Aemilius Papus, 3rd-century BC Roman consul and general
- Quintus Asconius Pedianus (BC 9 - AD 76), Roman historian
- Quintus Pedius (consul), Nephew or grandnephew of Julius Caesar
- Quintus Pedius (painter), Ancient Roman painter
- Quintus Egnatius Gallienus Perpetuus, Roman politician
- Quintus Sulpicius Camerinus Peticus, 1st century AD Roman senator and consul
- Quintus Publilius Philo, 4th century BC Roman politician
- Quintus Fabius Pictor, 3rd-century BC Roman historian
- Quintus Calpurnius Piso, Roman consul 135 BC
- Quintus Caecilius Metellus Pius, Roman politician and general, Pontifex Maximus, consul in 80 BCE
- Quintus Egrilius Plarianus, 2nd century Roman senator, governor and consul
- Quintus Plautius, 1st century AD Roman senator and consul
- Quintus Pleminius, Military Legate
- Quintus Mucius Scaevola Pontifex (consul in 97 BC), Ancient Roman jurist, politician and writer
- Quintus Fabius Postuminus, Late 1st/early 2nd century Roman senator, consul and governor
- Quintus Sulpicius Camerinus Praetextatus, 5th century BC Roman consul
- Quintus Pompeius Senecio Sosius Priscus, Roman Senator, notable for having the longest recorded name in ancient Rome
- Quintus Pompeius Sosius Priscus, 2nd century Roman senator, consul and governor
- Quintus Servilius Priscus (consul 468 BC), 5th-century BC Roman senator, consul and general
- Quintus Cornelius Proculus, 2nd century Roman senator and suffect consul
- Quintus Egnatius Proculus (suffect consul 219), 3rd century Roman senator and suffect consul
- Quintus Egnatius Proculus, Roman aristocrat
- Quintus Fulvius Gillo Bittius Proculus, Late 1st/early 2nd century Roman senator
- Quintus Servilius Pudens, Second century AD Roman senator and governor
- Quintus Cornelius Quadratus, 2nd century Roman senator and suffect consul
- Quintus Claudius Quadrigarius, 1st century BC Roman historian and writer
- Quintus Caecilius Redditus, Ancient Roman equite
- Quintus Marcius Rex (consul 68 BC), Roman politician and general
- Quintus Marcius Rex (consul 118 BC), Roman consul in 118 BC
- Quintus Marcius Rex (praetor 144 BC), Roman Politician
- Quintus Roscius, 1st-century BC Roman actor
- Quintus Corellius Rufus, 1st century Roman senator, consul and governor
- Quintus Curtius Rufus, 1st-century Roman historian
- Quintus Marcius Rufus, Roman legate during Third Servile War
- Quintus Pompeius Rufus (consul 88 BC), Roman politician, consul in 88 BC
- Quintus Pomponius Rufus, Late 1st/early 2nd century Roman senator, consul and governor
- Quintus Salvius Salvidienus Rufus, 1st Century BC Roman politician and general
- Quintus Tineius Rufus (consul 127), 2nd century Roman senator, consul and governor
- Quintus Tineius Rufus (consul 182), 2nd century Roman senator and consul
- Quintus Fabius Maximus Rullianus, 4th-century BC Roman statesman and general
- Quintus Titurius Sabinus, 1st century BC Roman legate
- Quintus Tineius Sacerdos, Roman senator and Consul in 219
- Quintus Aemilius Saturninus (died 200 AD), Roman member of the equites class
- Quintus Futius Lusius Saturninus, Roman senator and suffect consul of AD 41
- Quintus Volusius Saturninus, 1st century Roman Senator and consul
- Quintus Volusius Saturninus (consul 92), Late 1st/early 2nd century AD Roman senator and consul
- Quintus Cervidius Scaevola, 2nd century Roman jurist
- Quintus Terentius Scaurus, Latin grammarian
- Quintus Pomponius Secundus, First century Roman politician
- Quintus Vibius Secundus, Roman senator and suffect consul in 86 AD
- Quintus Sosius Senecio, Late 1st/early 2nd century AD Roman senator, consul and governor
- Quintus Sertorius (d. 73/72 BC), Roman general, politician, and rebel
- Quintus Servaeus, Roman governor of Commagene in 17 AD
- Quintus Fabius Maximus Servilianus, 2nd century BC Roman general and statesman
- Quintus Petronius Didius Severus, Father of Roman emperor Didius Julianus
- Quintus Varius Severus, Plebeian tribune in 90 BC
- Quintus Sextius, 1st century BC Roman philosopher
- Quintus Cloelius Siculus, Roman politician and patrician, consul in 498 BC
- Quintus Caecilius Metellus Creticus Silanus, 1st century Roman senator, consul and governor of Syria
- Quintus Poppaedius Silo (died 88 BC), Leader of the Italian Marsi
- Quintus Smyrnaeus, 4th-century Greek poet
- Quintus Marcius Barea Soranus (consul 34), 1st century AD Roman senator
- Quintus Valerius Soranus, Latin poet and inventor of the table of contents
- Quintus Petillius Spurinus (2nd century BC), Roman politician
- Quintus Baebius Sulca, 2nd century BC Roman praetor and envoy
- Quintus Marcius Barea Sura, 1st-century Roman senator
- Quintus Aurelius Symmachus (345–402 CE), Roman senator, orator and author
- Quintus Aurelius Symmachus (consul 446), 5th-century Roman senator
- Quintus Aurelius Memmius Symmachus (d. 526), Roman historian and politician
- Quintus Fabius Memmius Symmachus, Politician of the Roman Empire
- Quintus Baebius Tamphilus, Third Century BCE Roman statesman
- Quintus Minucius Thermus (consul 193 BC), Roman senator and general
- Quintus Minucius Thermus (governor of Asia), Roman tribune in 62 BC, praetor, and governor of Asia
- Quintus Aelius Tubero (consul), 1st-century BC Roman senator and consul
- Quintus Aelius Tubero (Stoic), Roman philosopher and politician
- Quintus Aelius Tubero (historian), Roman jurist, statesman and author
- Quintus Lollius Urbicus, 2nd-century senator, military commander and governor
- Quintus Veranius, 1st century AD Roman general, consul and governor
- Quintus Veranius (governor of Cappadocia), Roman governor of Cappadocia in 18 AD
- Quintus Fabius Maximus Verrucosus (c. 280 – 203 BC), Roman statesman and general
- Quintus Lucretius Vespillo, Roman consul
- Quintus Fabius Vibulanus (consul 467 BC), Roman senator and consul
- Quintus Fabius Vibulanus (consul 485 BC), Consul of the Roman Republic
- Quintus Fabius Vibulanus (consul 423 BC), 5th-century BC Roman consul and consular tribune
- Quintus Poetelius Libo Visolus, 5th-century BC Roman politician and decemvir
- Quintus Mamilius Vitulus, Third Century BCE Roman statesman and general, consul in 262 BCE

=== Surname ===
- Aksel Quintus Bosz (1915–1993), Surinamese jurist, politician, and professor
- Johan Wichers Quintus (1807–1864), Dutch notary and politician
- Justus Datho Quintus (1733–1817), Dutch politician
- Justus Datho Lewe Quintus (1811–1889), Dutch judge and politician
- Konrád Quintus (born 1960), Hungarian actor
- Mircea Ionescu-Quintus (1917–2017), Romanian politician
- Roelof Antonius Quintus (1816–1894), Dutch administrator
- Walter Quintus (1949–2017), German musician, composer, and audio engineer
- Willem Jan Quintus (1778–1839), Dutch politician

== See also ==
- Quentin
