= Phoenix (mythology) =

Immortal bird that is cyclically reborn

- The phoenix, "unica semper avis" (ever-singular bird), 1583

Creature information
- Grouping: Mythical creature
- Folklore: Greek mythology, Egyptian mythology, Phoenician mythology, and Persian mythology

Origin
- Country: Ancient Greece, Ancient Egypt, and Ancient Persia

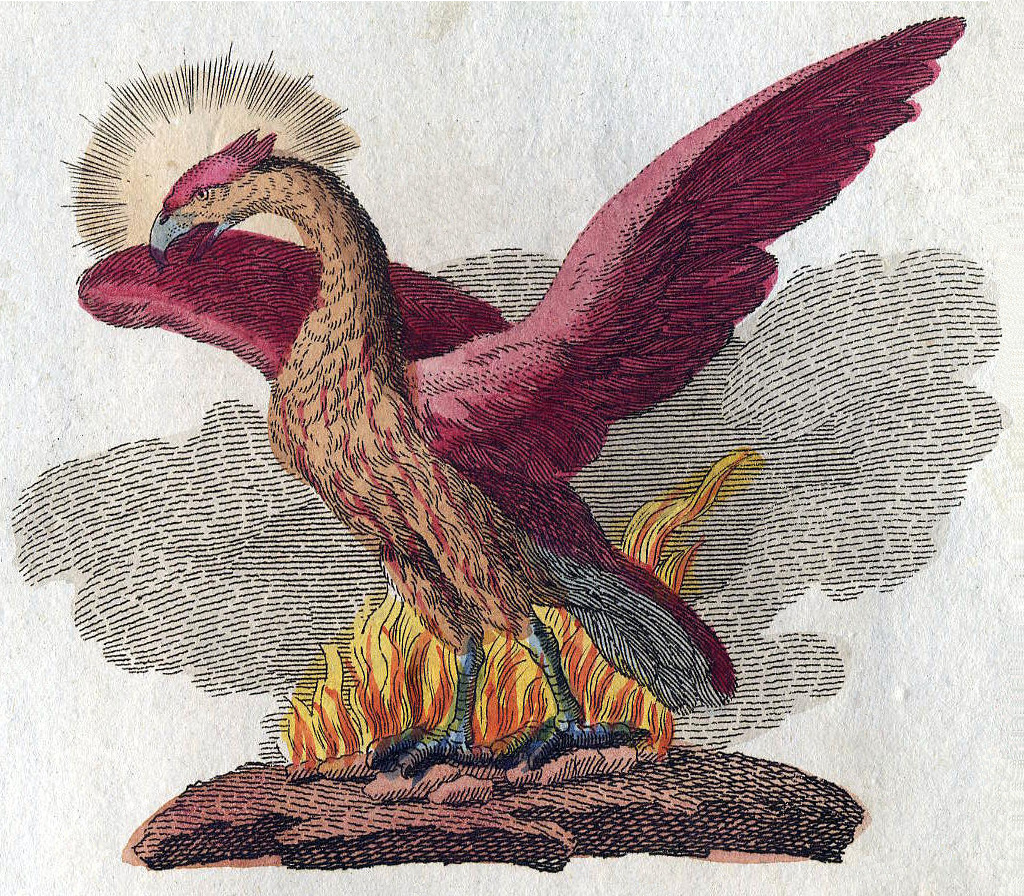
A depiction of a phoenix by Friedrich Justin Bertuch (1806)

The phoenix is a legendary immortal bird that cyclically regenerates or is otherwise born again. Originating in Greek mythology, it has analogues in many cultures, such as Egyptian and Persian mythology. Associated with the Sun, a phoenix obtains new life by rising from the ashes of its predecessor. Some legends say it dies in a show of flames and combustion, while others say that it simply burns to death and decomposes before being born again. In the Motif-Index of Folk-Literature, a tool used by folklorists, the phoenix is classified as motif B32.

The origin of the phoenix has been attributed to Ancient Egypt by Herodotus and later 19th-century scholars, but other scholars think the Egyptian texts may have been influenced by classical folklore. Over time, the phoenix motif spread and gained a variety of new associations; Herodotus, Lucan, Pliny the Elder, Pope Clement I, Lactantius, Ovid, and Isidore of Seville are among those who have contributed to the retelling and transmission of the phoenix motif. Over time, extending beyond its origins, the phoenix could variously "symbolise renewal in general as well as the sun, time, the Roman Empire, metempsychosis, consecration, resurrection, life in the heavenly paradise, Christ, Mary, virginity, the exceptional man, and certain aspects of Christian life". Some scholars have claimed that the poem De ave phoenice may present the mythological phoenix motif as a symbol of Christ's resurrection.

== Etymology ==
The modern English word phoenix (Note: Formerly also spelled phenix.) entered the English language from Latin, later reinforced by French. The word first entered the English language by way of a borrowing of Latin phoenīx into Old English (fenix). This borrowing was later reinforced by French influence, which had also borrowed the Latin noun. In time, the word developed specialised use in the English language: For example, the term could refer to an "excellent person" (12th century), a variety of heraldic emblem (15th century), and the name of a constellation (17th century).

The Latin word comes from Greek φοῖνιξ (phoinix). The Greek word is first attested in the Mycenaean Greek po-ni-ke, which probably meant "griffin", though it might have meant "palm tree". That word is probably a borrowing from a West Semitic word for madder, a red dye made from Rubia tinctorum. The word Phoenician appears to be from the same root, meaning "those who work with red dyes". So phoenix might also have meant "the Phoenician bird" or "the purplish-red bird".

== Early texts ==
Apart from the Linear B mention above from Mycenaean Greece, the earliest clear mention of the phoenix in ancient Greek literature occurs in a fragment of the Precepts of Chiron, attributed to 8th-century BC Greek poet Hesiod. In the fragment, the wise centaur Chiron tells a young hero Achilles the following:

A chattering crow lives now nine generations of aged men,
but a stag's life is four time a crow's,
and a raven's life makes three stags old,
while the phoenix outlives nine ravens,
but we, the rich-haired Nymphs
daughters of Zeus the aegis-holder,
outlive ten phoenixes.

Thereby describing the phoenix's lifetime as approximately 972 times the length of a human's.

== Disputed origins ==
Classical discourse attributes a potential origin of the phoenix to Ancient Egypt. Herodotus, writing in the 5th century BC, provides the following account of the phoenix:

[The Egyptians] have also another sacred bird called the phoenix which I myself have never seen, except in pictures. Indeed it is a great rarity, even in Egypt, only coming there (according to the accounts of the people of Heliopolis) once in five hundred years, when the old phoenix dies. Its size and appearance, if it is like the pictures, are as follow: The plumage is partly red, partly golden, while the general make and size are almost exactly that of the eagle. They tell a story of what this bird does, which does not seem to me to be credible: that he comes all the way from Arabia, and brings the parent bird, all plastered over with myrrh, to the temple of the Sun, and there buries the body. In order to bring him, they say, he first forms a ball of myrrh as big as he finds that he can carry; then he hollows out the ball and puts his parent inside, after which he covers over the opening with fresh myrrh, and the ball is then of exactly the same weight as at first; so he brings it to Egypt, plastered over as I have said, and deposits it in the temple of the Sun. Such is the story they tell of the doings of this bird.

In the 19th century, scholastic suspicions appeared to be confirmed by the discovery that Egyptians in Heliopolis had venerated the Bennu, a solar bird similar in some respects to the Greek phoenix. However, the Egyptian sources regarding the bennu are often problematic and open to a variety of interpretations. Some of these sources may have actually been influenced by Greek notions of the phoenix, rather than the other way around.

== Depictions ==
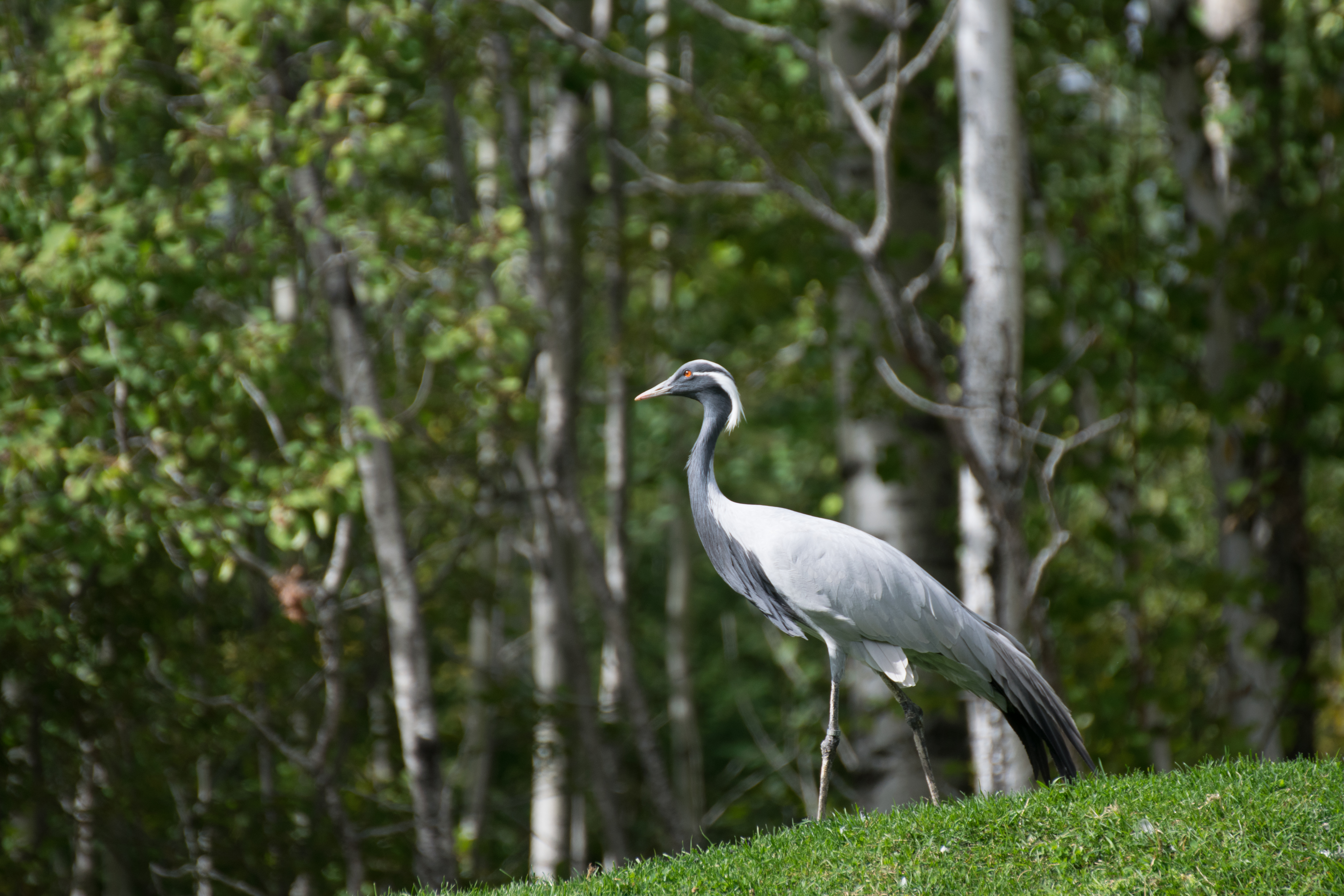
According to the Catalogue of the Greek Coins in the British Museum, the "Numidian crane" represents the phoenix on the coinage of Antoninus Pius (r. 138–161).

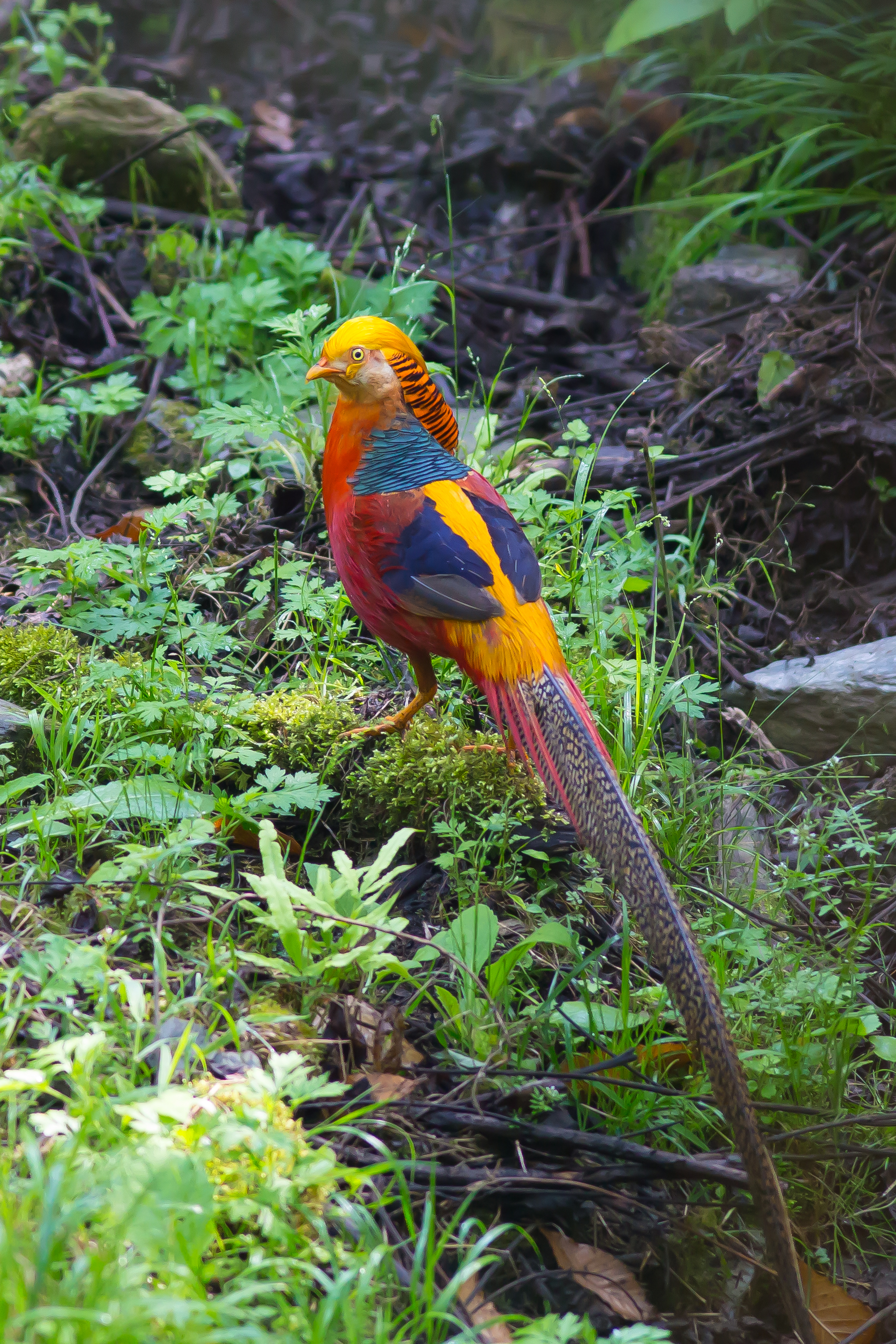
According to Harris Rackham, Pliny the Elder's description of a phoenix in Natural History "tallies fairly closely with the golden pheasant of the Far East".

The phoenix is often depicted in ancient and medieval literature and medieval art endowed with a halo, emphasising the bird's connection with the Sun. The earliest recorded images of the phoenix feature nimbuses that often have seven rays, like Helios (the Greek personification of the Sun). Pliny the Elder also describes the bird as having a crest of feathers on its head, and Ezekiel the Dramatist compared it to a rooster.

The phoenix came to be associated with specific colours over time. Although the phoenix was generally believed to be colourful and vibrant, sources provide no clear consensus about its exact colouration. Tacitus says that its color made it stand out from all other birds. Some said that the bird had peacock-like colouring, and Herodotus's claim of the Phoenix being red and yellow is popular in many versions of the story on record. Ezekiel the Tragedian declared that the phoenix had red legs and striking yellow eyes, but Lactantius said that its eyes were blue like sapphires and that its legs were covered in yellow-gold scales with rose-colored talons.

Herodotus, Pliny, Solinus, and Philostratus describe the phoenix as similar in size to an eagle, but Lactantius and Ezekiel the Dramatist both claim that the phoenix was larger, with Lactantius declaring that it was even larger than an ostrich.

According to Pliny's Natural History,

aquilae narratur magnitudine, auri fulgore circa colla, cetero purpureus, caeruleam roseis caudam pinnis distinguentibus, cristis fauces, caputque plumeo apice honestante.

— Pliny the Elder, "Naturalis historia", X: 2
Translation:

The story is that it is as large as an eagle, and has a gleam of gold round its neck and all the rest of it is purple, but the tail blue picked out with rosecoloured feathers and the throat picked out with tufts, and a feathered crest adorning its head.

— translated by Harris Rackham, 1940, LCL: 353, pp. 292–294

According to Claudian's poem "The Phoenix",

arcanum radiant oculi iubar. igneus ora
cingit honos. rutilo cognatum vertice sidus
attollit cristatus apex tenebrasque serena
luce secat. Tyrio pinguntur crura veneno.
antevolant Zephyros pinnae, quas caerulus ambit
flore color sparsoque super ditescit in auro.

— Claudian, "Phoenix", ll. 17–22
Translation:

A mysterious fire flashes from its eye,
and a flaming aureole enriches its head. Its crest
shines with the sun's own light and shatters the
darkness with its calm brilliance. Its legs are of Tyrian
purple; swifter than those of the Zephyrs are its wings
of flower-like blue dappled with rich gold.

— translated by Henry Maurice Platnauer, 1922, LCL: 136, pp. 224–225

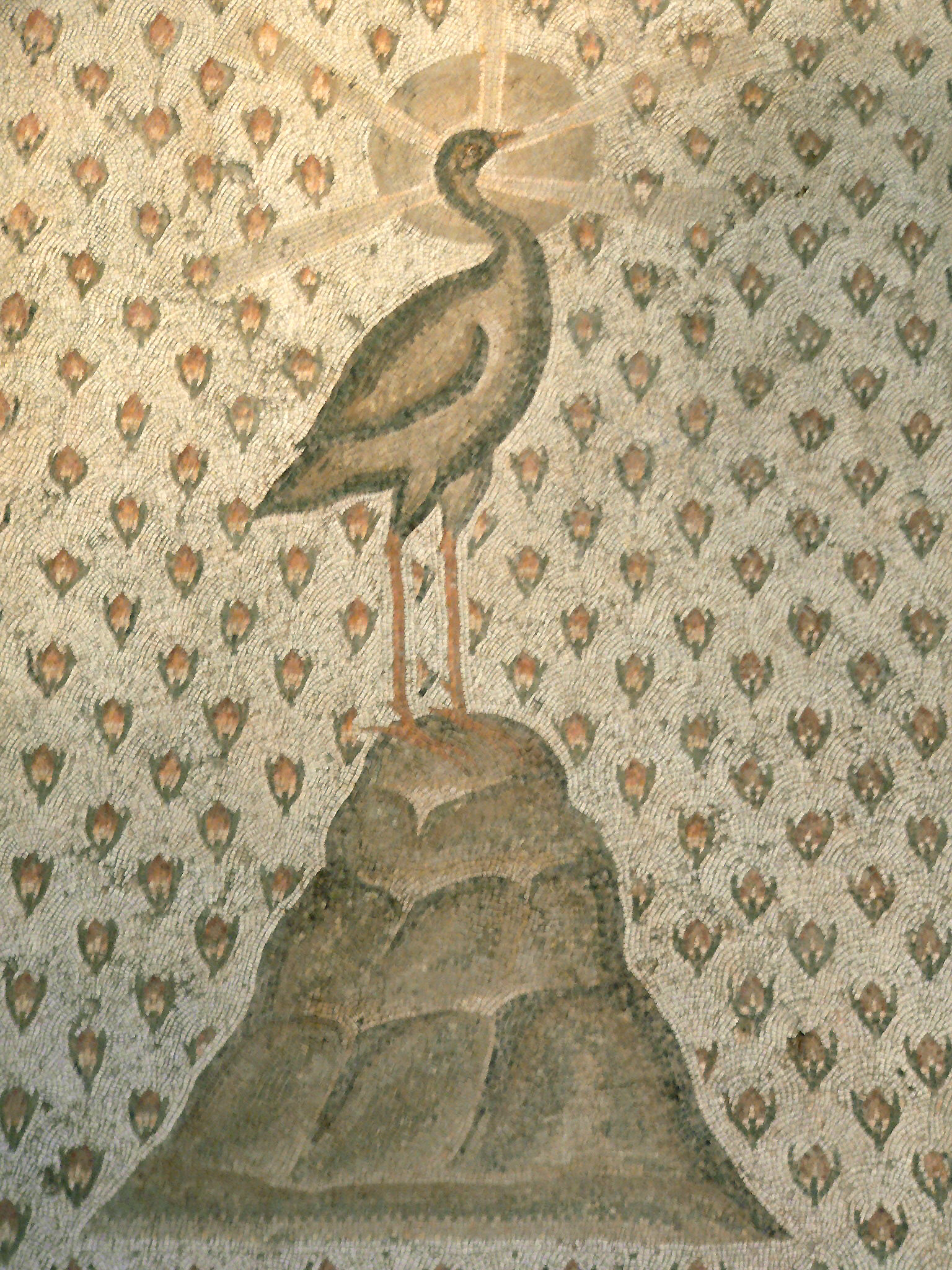
5th-century mosaic of a nimbate phoenix from Daphne, Antioch, in Roman Syria (Louvre)

== Appearances ==
According to Pliny the Elder, a senator Manilius (Marcus Manilius?) had written that the phoenix appeared at the end of each Great Year, which he wrote of "in the consulship of Gnaeus Cornelius and Publius Licinius", that is, in 96 BC, that a cycle was 540 years, and that it was 215 into the cycle (i.e. it began in 311 BC). Another of Pliny's sources, Cornelius Valerianus, is cited for an appearance of the phoenix in 36 AD "in the consulship of Quintus Plautius and Sextus Papinius". Pliny states that a purported phoenix seen in Egypt in 47 AD was brought to the capital and exhibited in the Comitium in time for the 800th anniversary of the foundation of Rome by Romulus, though he added that "nobody would doubt that this phoenix was a fabrication".

A second recording of the phoenix was made by Tacitus, who said that the phoenix had appeared instead in 34 AD "in the consulship of Paulus Fabius and Lucius Vitellius" and that the cycle was either 500 years or 1461 years (which was the Great Year based on the Egyptian Sothic cycle), and that it had previously been seen in the reigns first of Sesosis, then of Amasis, and finally of Ptolemy (third of the Macedonian dynasty). A third recording was made by Cassius Dio, who also said that the phoenix was seen in the consulship of Quintus Plautus and Sextus Papinius.

== Diffusion in later culture ==
In time, the motif and concept of the phoenix extended from its origins in ancient Greek folklore. For example, the classical motif of the phoenix continues into the Gnostic manuscript On the Origin of the World from the Nag Hammadi Library collection in Egypt, generally dated to the 4th century:

[...] a soul-endowed living creature called "phoenix". It kills itself and brings itself back to life as a witness to the judgement against them, for they did wrong to Adam and his race, unto the consummation of the age. There are [...] three phoenixes in paradise—the first is immortal, the second lives 1,000 years; as for the third, it is written in the sacred book that it is consumed. [...] And the phoenix first appears in a living state, and dies, and rises again, being a sign of what has become apparent at the consummation of the age.

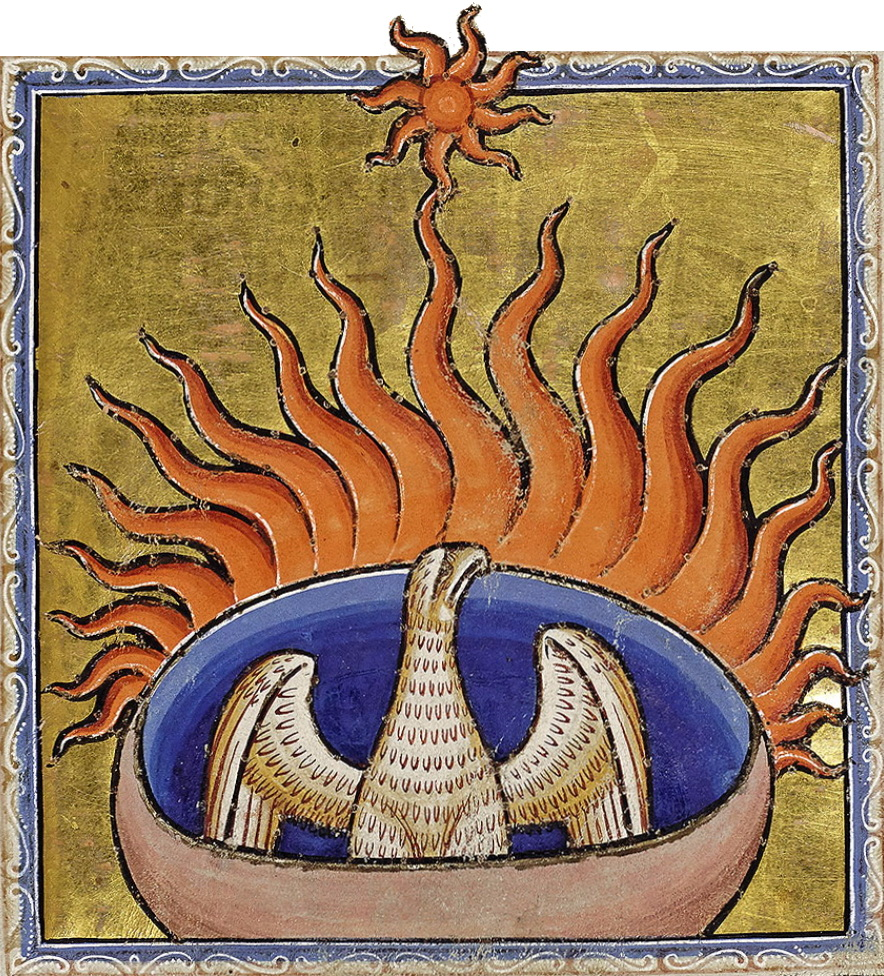
Detail from the 12th-century Aberdeen Bestiary, featuring a phoenix

In Greece, the phoenix rising from flames was the symbol of the First Hellenic Republic under Ioannis Kapodistrias, the Mountain Government and the Regime of the Colonels.

The anonymous 10th-century Old English Exeter Book contains a 677-line 9th-century alliterative poem consisting of a paraphrase and abbreviation of Lactantius, followed by an explication of the Phoenix as an allegory for the resurrection of Christ.

Þisses fugles gecynd fela gelices
bi þam gecornum Cristes þegnum;
beacnað in burgum hu hi beorhtne gefean
þurh fæder fultum on þas frecnan tid
healdaþ under heofonum ond him heanna blæd
in þam uplican eðle gestrynaþ.

— In the original Old English
Translation:

This bird's nature is much like
to the chosen servants of Christ;
pointeth out to men how they bright joy
through the Father's aid in this perilous time
may under heaven possess, and exalted happiness
in the celestial country may gain.

— In Modern English translation (1842)

In the 14th century, Italian poet Dante Alighieri refers to the phoenix in Canto XXIV of the Divine Comedy's Inferno:

Così per li gran savi si confessa
che la fenice more e poi rinasce,
quando al cinquecentesimo anno appressa;

erba né biado in sua vita non pasce,
ma sol d'incenso lagrime e d'amomo,
e nardo e mirra son l'ultime fasce.

— In the original Italian
Translation:

Even thus by the great sages 'tis confessed
The phoenix dies, and then is born again,
When it approaches its five-hundredth year;

On herb or grain it feeds not in its life,
But only on tears of incense and amomum,
And nard and myrrh are its last winding-sheet.

— In English translation

The phoenix was one of many emblems associated with Queen Elizabeth I. The queen "never married or had children, and linking her to a phoenix made a virtue of the situation; she, like the mythic Arabian bird, was above gender distinctions, but possessed the best qualities of both sexes."

The Phoenix portrait of Elizabeth I

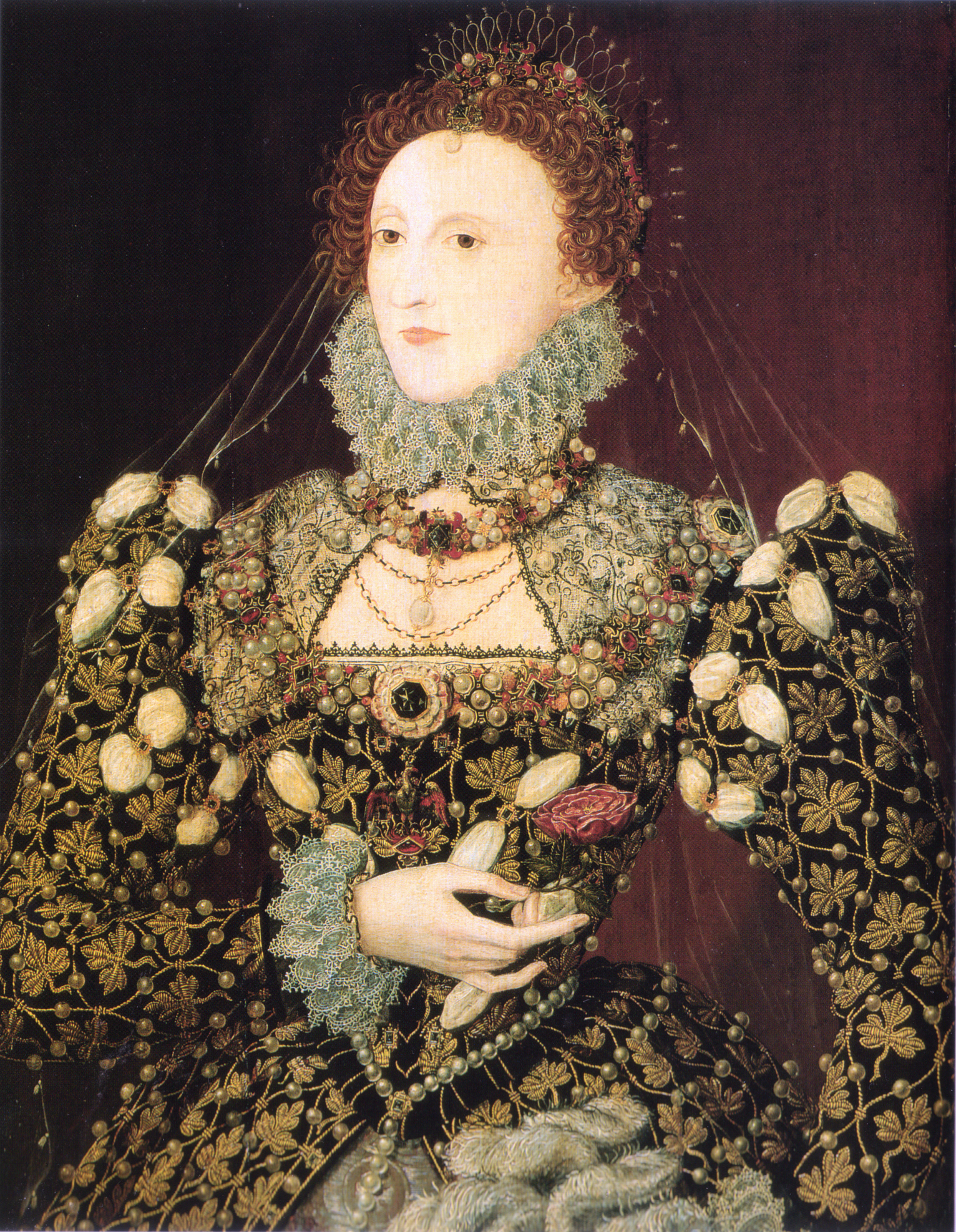
Nicholas Hilliard (attr.), 1575-76. Tate Museum, London.

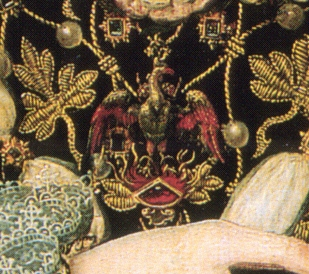
Detail: Embroidery of the phoenix

In the 17th-century play Henry VIII by English playwrights William Shakespeare and John Fletcher, Archbishop Thomas Cranmer says in Act V, Scene v:

... Nor shall this peace sleep with her; but as when
The bird of wonder dies, the maiden phoenix,
Her ashes new create another heir
As great in admiration as herself;
So shall she leave her blessedness to one,
When heaven shall call her from this cloud of darkness,
Who from the sacred ashes of her honour
Shall star-like rise as great in fame as she was,
And so stand fix'd ...

The clear implication is that Elizabeth had, as the phoenix, the capacity to produce an heir by herself in spite of her virginity.

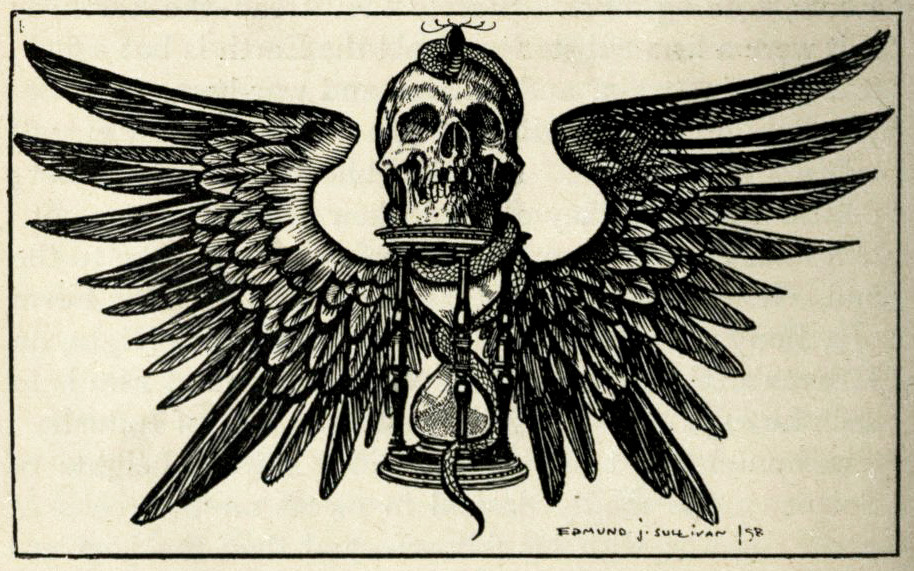
"Time and Death", 1898 illustration by E. J. Sullivan for Sartor Resartus

In the 19th-century novel Sartor Resartus by Thomas Carlyle, Diogenes Teufelsdröckh uses the phoenix as a metaphor for the cyclical pattern of history, remarking upon the "burning of a World-Phoenix" and the "Palingenesia, or Newbirth of Society" from its ashes:

When the Phoenix is fanning her funeral pyre, will there not be sparks flying! Alas, some millions of men, and among them such as a Napoleon, have already been licked into that high-eddying Flame, and like moths consumed there. Still also have we to fear that incautious beards will get singed.
For the rest, in what year of grace such Phoenix-cremation will be completed, you need not ask. The law of Perseverance is among the deepest in man: by nature he hates change; seldom will he quit his old house till it has actually fallen about his ears. Thus have I seen Solemnities linger as Ceremonies, sacred Symbols as idle Pageants, to the extent of three hundred years and more after all life and sacredness had evaporated out of them. And then, finally, what time the Phoenix Death-Birth itself will require, depends on unseen contingencies.—Meanwhile, would Destiny offer Mankind, that after, say two centuries of convulsion and conflagration, more or less vivid, the fire-creation should be accomplished, and we to find ourselves again in a Living Society, and no longer fighting but working,—were it not perhaps prudent in Mankind to strike the bargain?

Phoenixes are present and relatively common in European heraldry, which developed during the High Middle Ages. They most often appear as crests, and more rarely as charges. The heraldic phoenix is depicted as the head, chest and wings of an eagle rising from a fire; the entire creature is never depicted.

== Analogues ==
Scholars have observed analogues to the phoenix in a variety of cultures. These analogues include the Hindu garuda (गरुड) and bherunda (भेरुण्ड), the Slavic firebird (жар-птица) and Raróg, the Persian simorgh (سیمرغ), the Georgian paskunji (ფასკუნჯი), the Arabian anqa (عنقاء), the Turkish Konrul, also called Zümrüdü Anka ("emerald anqa"), the Tibetan Me byi karmo, the Chinese Fenghuang (鳳凰) and Zhuque (朱雀). These perceived analogues are sometimes included as part of the Motif-Index of Folk-Literature phoenix motif (B32).

== In popular culture ==
Many works of modern literature make reference to the phoenix. Examples include:

- In Neil Gaiman's short story "Sunbird", a party of Epicureans finally answer the question of what happens when a Phoenix is roasted and eaten; you burst into flames, and "the years burn off you". This can kill those who are inexperienced, but those who have swallowed fire and practised with glow-worms can achieve eternal youth.
- The Harry Potter series features a phoenix named Fawkes, described as Professor Dumbledore's loyal pet, and also a secret society called the Order of the Phoenix (the titular organisation of the fifth book of the series).
- In Terry Pratchett's novel Carpe Jugulum, the search for the phoenix forms an important side plot.
- In Eiichiro Oda's manga and anime series One Piece, "Phoenix Marco" is a prominent character (a member of the Whitebeard Pirates) who possesses the Mythical Zoan-type Devil Fruit called the Tori Tori no Mi, Model: Phoenix, which allows him to transform into a phoenix.
- The Phoenix is portrayed as a powerful cosmic entity in the Marvel Comics mythology. Through the avatar of Jean Grey and its other beholders, the Phoenix Force is most often linked to X-Men comics storylines.

== See also ==
- Chol (Bible), a Hebrew word sometimes glossed as phoenix
- Simurgh, a benevolent bird in Persian mythology with some similarities to the phoenix
- Phenex, a demon depicted as a phoenix
