= Veranius =

Veranius is a surname. Notable people with the surname include:

- Quintus Veranius (died AD 57), Roman general
- Quintus Veranius (governor of Cappadocia) (fl. AD 18–20), Romam governor

== See also ==
- Veranus of Vence, 5th-century bishop
