= Gaius Manlius Valens =

Roman senator, general and consul (AD 6-96)

Gaius Manlius Valens (AD 6 – 96) was a Roman senator of the late first century AD. He was selected as consul ordinarius in his ninetieth year, serving with Gaius Antistius Vetus in AD 96.

The primary sources differ over Manlius Valens' praenomen. A number of inscriptions state it is "Titus", such as CIL VI, 17707; however both Cassius Dio and the Fasti Ostienses state it is "Gaius".

Aged 45 or 46, Valens was already older than the average legatus commanding a legion in Roman Britain when the governor Publius Ostorius Scapula died. The identity of the legion is not definitely known: although Legio II Augusta has been proposed, Anthony Birley believes Legio XX Valeria Victrix is more likely. Although emperor Claudius quickly selected a replacement for Scapula, Aulus Didius Gallus, between Scapula's death and the arrival of a new governor the Silures had defeated the legion under Valens' command.

The defeat in Britain likely set back his career, for Manlius Valens does not appear in the historical record until towards the end of the reign of Nero, when he became legate of the newly formed Legio I Italica at Lugdunum; this fact caused Birley to comment that "at sixty-two or sixty-three he is by far the oldest known legionary legate." During the Year of the Four Emperors, Valens and the legion sided with Lucius Vitellius; however, this did not gain him any favor from Vitellius due to Fabius Valens defaming him behind his back. Since Legio I Italica was present at the two battles of Bedriacum, it is likely Valens was also a participant in one or both battles. However, with the success of Vespasian, Valens retired from public life.

Why Domitian selected him, a general of an enemy of his father, as eponymous consul almost 30 years later, Birley confesses is a mystery. Manlius Valens died the same year he was consul.

Political offices
Preceded by Quintus Pomponius Rufus, and Lucius Baebius Tullus as Suffect consuls	Consul of the Roman Empire; 96 with Gaius Antistius Vetus	Succeeded by Quintus Fabius Postuminus, and Titus Prifernius as Suffect consuls
