= Quintus (disambiguation) =

Quintus is a given name and a surname in various languages.

Quintus may also refer to:

- Quintus (praenomen), a Latin praenomen in Ancient Rome
- Quintus (vocal music), the fifth voice in a piece of vocal polyphony
- Schempp-Hirth Quintus, Open Class glider
- Quintus Prolog, a logic programming system
