= Papinia gens =

Ancient Roman family

The gens Papinia was a plebeian family at ancient Rome. Members of this gens are first mentioned toward the end of the Republic. In imperial times, the family achieved some prominence, with Sextus Papinius Alienus holding the consulship in AD 36. The nomen Papinius is sometimes confused with the more common Papirius and Pomponius.

== Origin ==
Papinius appears to belong to a class of nomina derived from other names using the gentile-forming suffix -inius. In this instance, the name seems to be derived from the Oscan nomen Papius, or its root, the cognomen Papus, indicating that the Papinii were probably of Sabine or Samnite extraction.

== Members ==
This list includes abbreviated praenomina. For an explanation of this practice, see filiation.

- Lucius Papinius, (Note: Called Papirius in some manuscripts.) a wealthy eques, whose property was taken by Verres.
- Papinius, the author of an epigram about Publius Servilius Casca, quoted by Varro and Priscian.
- Papinius, a military tribune in the time of Caligula.
- Sextus Papinius Q. f. Alienus, consul in AD 36, had a distinguished public career, serving as quaestor, tribune of the plebs, praetor peregrinus in AD 27, governor of one of the imperial provinces, and one of the quindecimviri sacris faciundis. Pliny reports that he introduced the jujube and another exotic fruit to Italy.
- Sextus Papinius Sex. f. Q. n., a young man who squandered his fortune, encouraged by his mother, who raised him for many years after her divorce. When his situation became desperate, he threw himself from a window and ended his life. His mother was banished for a period of ten years, so that her younger son would be raised without her influence.
- Sextus Papinius, (Note: Cassius Dio calls him, perhaps erroneously, the son of Anicius Cerealis, who shared his fate; but it is possible that Anicius is a mistake for Alienus or Allenius, or that Anicius is the correct reading of the consul's very uncertain name.) arrested by Caligula, who tortured him in order to make him implicate others in a plot against the emperor, and then put him to death. He is sometimes supposed to be the son of the consul Papinius, although Tacitus places his death in the reign of Tiberius. (Note: Tacitus expressly states that the Sextus Papinius who took his own life was from a consular family, although he does not call him the consul's son. Neither Seneca nor Cassius Dio identify Caligula's victim as a relative of the consul Papinius. However, the Papinius mentioned by Tacitus did have a younger brother, and it is entirely possible that both were named Sextus, and distinguished by their cognomina, which have not been preserved.)
- Publius Papinius Statius, a grammarian who received a number of prizes in literary competitions, opened a school at Neapolis circa AD 39. He was the tutor of Domitian. His wife was Agellina, and they were the parents of the poet Statius.
- Publius Papinius P. f. Statius, a celebrated poet who lived in the latter part of the first century. He lived at Neapolis, and benefited from the patronage of Domitian, whom he praises in his works.

== See also ==
- List of Roman gentes

== Bibliography ==
- Marcus Terentius Varro, De Lingua Latina (On the Latin Language).
- Lucius Annaeus Seneca (Seneca the Younger), De Ira (On Anger).
- Gaius Plinius Secundus (Pliny the Elder), Naturalis Historia (Natural History).
- Flavius Josephus, Antiquitates Judaïcae (Antiquities of the Jews).
- Publius Cornelius Tacitus, Annales.
- Lucius Cassius Dio Cocceianus (Cassius Dio), Roman History.
- Priscianus Caesariensis (Priscian), Institutiones Grammaticae (Institutes of Grammar).
- Dictionary of Greek and Roman Biography and Mythology, William Smith, ed., Little, Brown and Company, Boston (1849).
- George Davis Chase, "The Origin of Roman Praenomina", in Harvard Studies in Classical Philology, vol. VIII (1897).
- Paul von Rohden, Elimar Klebs, & Hermann Dessau, Prosopographia Imperii Romani (The Prosopography of the Roman Empire, abbreviated PIR), Berlin (1898).
