= Tiberius Catius Caesius Fronto =

Tiberius Catius Caesius Fronto was a Roman senator who was suffect consul in the nundinium of September to December 96 AD with Marcus Calpurnius [...]icus as his colleague. These two consuls were presiding over the Roman Senate when the Emperor Domitian was assassinated (18 September 96), and Nerva elevated as emperor. Fronto was an acquaintance of Pliny the Younger, and he is mentioned as many as four times in the collected letters.

From the elements in his name, Olli Salomies believes it likely that Fronto had been adopted by the senator and poet Silius Italicus, and his name at birth was Tiberius Caesius Fronto, or may have been his nephew. If Fronto was not adopted by Italicus, then the common elements in their names were due to his being Italicus' nephew.

== Life ==
Pliny describes Fronto as "a man with the greatest expertise at extracting tears", and mentions him taking part in three different trials: in the penalty phase of the case of Marius Priscus, who had been proconsul of Africa and was indicted by the people he had governed; in the prosecution of Julius Bassus, who had been accused of mismanagement while proconsul of Bithynia and Pontus; and in the matter of Varenus Rufus, also indicted by the people of Bithynia and Pontus for mismanagement. These prove he was active in the Senate during the first years of the second century. Pliny may be referring to him when he writes to his friend Caninus Rufus about the death of the poet Silius Italicus: in that letter, he mentions that the oldest son was doing well and had attained the consulship.

Although his wife has not yet been identified, Fronto is known to have had a daughter, Caesia Frontina.

== Senatorial career ==
Fronto is not known to have held any offices, either in the emperor's service or proconsulships, in the public sector of the Empire. He is known to have been a member of the Arval Brethren, and is recorded having attended their meetings in 98 and 105.

However John D. Grainger believes that as Fronto was one of two consuls at the time of the emperor Domitian's murder, he was party to the conspiracy. Grainger argues Fronto's family was firmly in the party that was hostile to Domitian, if not the Flavian dynasty in general. Although Domitian had appointed him to the highly influential and prestigious office of consul, Domitian had practiced a policy of appointing members of different groups or factions in the Senate in order to gain their support. Lastly, Grainger notes that upon learning of Domitian's death, the consuls, who presided over the Senate and had the authority to convene it, summoned the Senators to a session the next day. "If he had not been originally involved in the plot," notes Grainger, "it would take him some time to convince him of the murder, and he would demand proof -- a sight of the body, no doubt -- which would delay matters even more. The cumulative delays would add up to several hours, yet the Senate met next morning."

== See also ==
- List of Roman consuls

Political offices
Preceded by Quintus Fabius Postuminus, and Titus Prifernius as Suffect consuls	Suffect consul of the Roman Empire; 96 with Marcus Calpurnius [...]icus	Succeeded by Marcus Cocceius Nerva III, and Lucius Verginius Rufus III as Ordinary consuls
