= Marcus Porcius Cato (consul 36) =

1st century AD Roman senator and consul

Marcus Porcius Cato was a Roman senator active during the Principate. He was suffect consul in the latter half of AD 36 as the colleague of Gaius Vettius Rufus. Although he shares the identical name of several members of the Republican Porcii, Ronald Syme expressed reservations that he is related to that famed family. Stephen Dyson has cataloged 56 people living in the provinces of Roman Spain who took on the gentilicium "Porcius", who were either clientes or descendants of clientes of Cato the Elder while he was proconsul of Spain, which makes Syme's suspicions plausible.

== Life ==
The historian Tacitus mentions Cato in his Annales. At the beginning of the year 28, during the ascendancy of the powerful prefect of the Praetorian Guard, Sejanus, Titus Sabinus, an eques of the highest rank, was imprisoned due to his friendship with Germanicus. "He had indeed persisted in showing marked respect towards Germanicus' wife and children," writes Tacitus, "as their visitor at home, their companion in public, the solitary survivor of so many clients." Cato, along with three other ex-praetors – Latinus Latiaris, Petitius Rufus, and Marcus Opsius – managed to elicit treasonable comments from Sabinus, which they then passed on to Tiberius. The emperor accepted the evidence at face value, and had Sabinus executed.

Apparently in the lost books of his Annales Tacitus recounts Cato's execution, for, at the conclusion of a passage about the condemnation of Titus Sabinus, Tacitus admits to wanting to describe the deaths of those who had informed against him. The historian remarks that some were executed after Caligula came to power, while others perished at Tiberius' command. After noting how these informants mattered so little to Tiberius that "he frequently, when he was tired of them and fresh ones offered themselves for the same services, flung off the old", Tacitus promises to describe their fates at the appropriate section. None of these men are mentioned again in the surviving portions of his work, yet Frontinus reports that Cato was cura aquarum in the year 38, so it is safe to conclude that Caligula had Porcius Cato executed between that year and the year of his own death (AD 41).

While the name of his wife is not yet known, Cato was survived by a daughter, Porcia, a cousin of Gellius Rutilius Lupus.

== See also ==
- List of Roman consuls

== Notes ==
Political offices
Preceded by Sextus Papinius Allenius, and Quintus Plautius	Consul of the Roman Empire; 36 with Gaius Vettius Rufus	Succeeded by Gnaeus Acerronius Proculus, and Gaius Petronius Pontius Nigrinus
