= Quintus Pomponius Rufus =

Late 1st/early 2nd century Roman senator, consul and governor

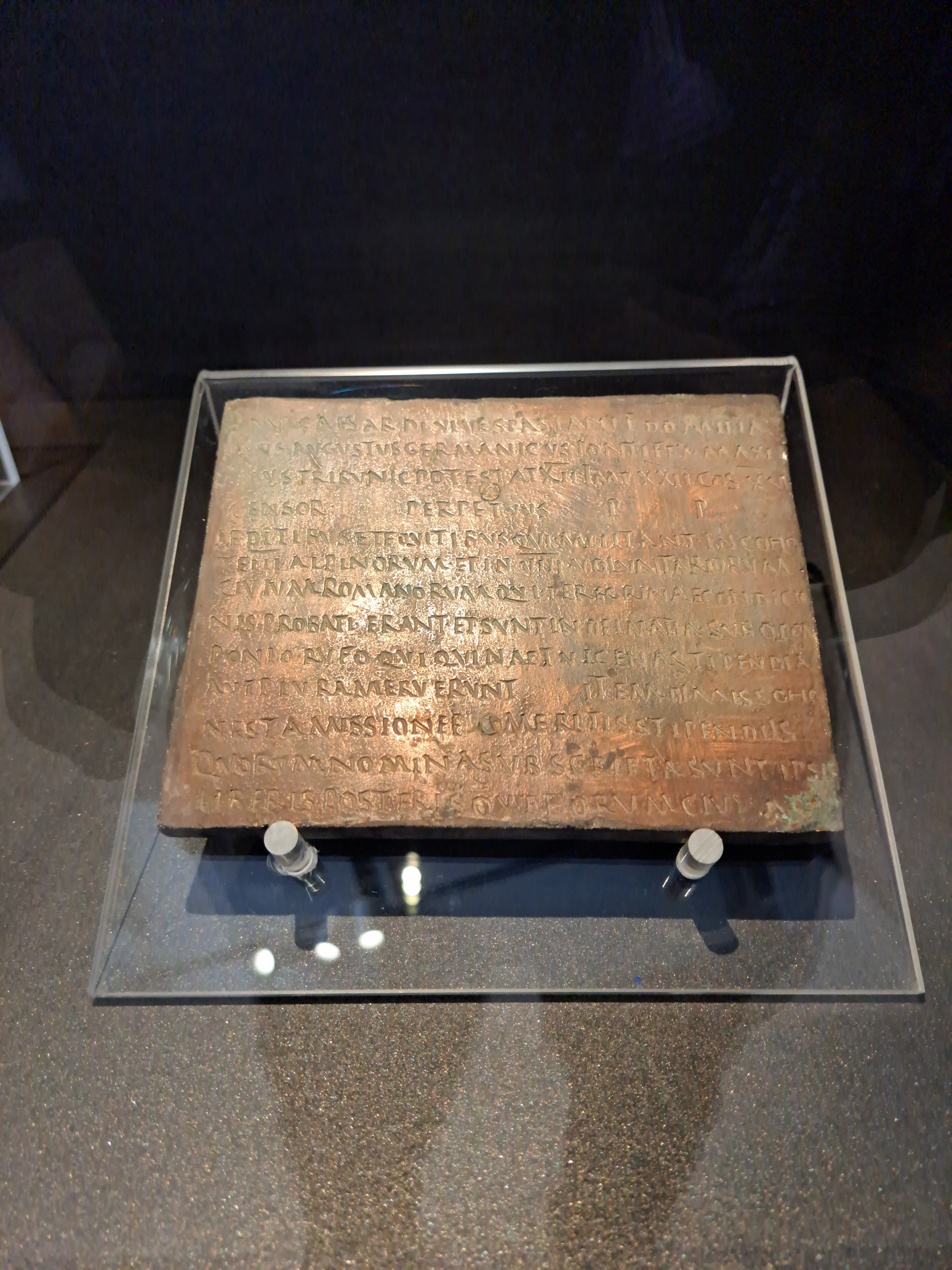
- Military diploma CIL XVI, 38, dated July 13th 94, attesting him as governor

suffect consul

Quintus Pomponius Rufus was a Roman senator active in the imperial service; he was governor during the reigns of the emperors Domitian and Trajan. Rufus was also suffect consul for the nundinium September–December AD 95 as the colleague of Lucius Baebius Tullus. Pomponius Rufus is known primarily from inscriptions.

== Career ==
An inscription from the Arch of Trajan in Lepcis Magna provides us some of the details of his cursus honorum. However, as Ronald Syme states, it "is perplexing in more ways than one." One issue is that the inscription lacks any mention of his traditional Republican magistracies -- quaestor, plebeian tribune, and praetor; while not all such inscriptions include these magistracies, more do than do not. Another is the mention that Rufus was praefectus orae maritimae Hispaniae citer(ioris) Galliae Narbonensis bello quod Imperator Galba ("prefect of the coasts of nearer Spain, and Gallia Narbonensis in the war which Emperor Galba fought for the Republic"). Syme observes this was Rufus' debut, in the Year of Four Emperors. "Galba's own insurrection in Spain, the war he raised against Nero, [was] under the name and plea of the Res Publica. Galba had support in certain cities of Narbonensis, such as Vienna. The coast now acquired strategic importance." Rufus was assigned the defense of the coasts of the provinces Baetica and Narbonensis, which leads to a number of insights. One is that Rufus was an important supporter of one of the rivals of the eventual victor Vespasian, yet survived the violence. Another is that Rufus was at least 30 years old in the year 69, which means he was at least 56 years old when he acceded to the consulate.

The next issue, in chronological order, is that he was commissioned legatus legionis or commander of a "Legio V"; this could be either Legio V Alaudae or Legio V Macedonica, both of which were in existence at this time. The Fifth Alaudae suffered severe losses in AD 70 during the Batavian rebellion, and may have been disbanded soon after.

A fourth issue is the inscription records he was legatus Augusti pro praetor provinciarum Moesia Dalmatia [et] Hispania, or governor of three imperial provinces. His time in two of these are documented from military diplomas. Pomponius Rufus is attested as governor of Dalmatia on 13 July 94; Werner Eck has interpreted this to indicate his tenure as governor ran from the year 92 to 95, the year Rufus became consul. Following his consulate, he was appointed governor of the province of Moesia Inferior from 98 to 100. This leaves the issue when he governed "Hispania"—presumably Hispania Tarraconensis—to be solved. If the names were listed in reverse chronological order, then his tenure there completed before the year 94. There is a gap in the list of governors for this province between the offices of Gaius Calpetanus Rantius Quirinalis Valerius Festus (78-81) and Gaius Catellius Celer (85-90); his own tenure as governor probably fell between those two. There is another possibility: Syme notes that Rufus may have served in that province as a juridicus, as had other senators. Syme admits that "in correct terminology [Rufus' office] is not styled leg. Aug. pro pr. But this inscription is not correct in all respects." Syme dates a possible posting as "iuridicus before or after Glitius Agricola, consul suffect in 97."

According to the inscription on the Arch of Trajan, Rufus was a member of the sodales Flaviales, and later admitted to the prestigious college of pontiffs.

His first appointment after his tenure as suffect consul was curator operum publicorum, or overseer of public works in Rome. The two appointments to the provinces mentioned above followed—Dalmatia and Moesia Inferior. The final office Rufus held is known from the before-mentioned Arch of Trajan; Rufus achieved the mark of a successful senatorial career by being proconsular governor of Africa in 110/111. This inscription was the work of his own legatus or adjucant, Lucius Asinius Rufus.

When Rufus stepped down as proconsul in the year 111, he was at least 72 years old. Based on our knowledge of ancient Roman demographics, it is likely Pomponius Rufus died soon after he returned to Rome.

== See also ==
- Pomponia gens

Political offices
Preceded by Aulus Bucius Lappius Maximus, and Publius Ducenius Verus as Suffect consuls	Suffect consul of the Roman Empire; 95 with Lucius Baebius Tullus	Succeeded by Gaius Manlius Valens, and Gaius Antistius Vetus as Ordinary consuls
