= Baebia gens =

Ancient Roman family

The gens Baebia was a plebeian family at ancient Rome. The first member of the gens who obtained the consulship was Gnaeus Baebius Tamphilus, in 182 BC. During the later Republic, the Baebii were frequently connected with the patrician family of the Aemilii.

== Praenomina ==
The main praenomina of Baebii during the Republic were Quintus, Gnaeus, Marcus, and Lucius, all of which were common names throughout Roman history. In addition to these, they occasionally used Gaius and Aulus. Other names occur under the Empire.

== Branches and cognomina ==
The cognomina of the Baebii are Dives, Herennius, Sulca, and Tamphilus. The last, borne by the oldest family of the Baebii appearing in history, is the only surname which appears on coins, where it is written Tampilus. All of the consuls and most of the praetors of this gens during the Republic belonged to this branch of the family. Chase describes their surname as one of considerable curiosity, suggested by some scholars to be of Greek origin, but perhaps an Oscan name sharing a common root with the Tampia gens, who may have been of Sabine origin. Certainly Herennius, borne as a surname by one of the Baebii, was originally an Oscan praenomen. In imperial times, one family of the Baebii settled around Saguntum, the Spanish town over which the Second Punic War had begun.

== Members ==
This list includes abbreviated praenomina. For an explanation of this practice, see filiation.

=== Baebii Tamphili ===
- Quintus Baebius Cn. f. Tamphilus, an envoy sent to Hannibal at Saguntum in 219 BC, and then to Carthage.
- Quintus Baebius (Tamphilus), tribune of the plebs in 200 BC, opposed a motion to declare war on Philip V of Macedon, and accused the Senate of warmongering; perhaps the eldest brother of the consular Baebii.
- Gnaeus Baebius Q. f. Cn. n. Tamphilus, praetor in 199 BC, was assigned to Cisalpine Gaul, where he was defeated by the Insubres; the consul Lucius Cornelius Lentulus replaced him, and sent Baebius to Rome. Consul in 182, Baebius fought against the Ligures with some success.
- Marcus Baebius Q. f. Cn. n. Tamphilus, consul in 181 BC.
- Gnaeus Baebius (Cn. f. Q. n.) Tamphilus, praetor urbanus in 168 BC. The following year, he was one of five legates sent into Illyricum.
- Marcus Baebius Q. f. Tamphilus, triumvir monetalis in 137 BC.
- (Marcus) Baebius (Tamphilus), tribune of the plebs in 103 BC, attempted to veto the agrarian law of his colleague, Saturninus, who had proposed that veterans should be granted parcels of land in the province of Africa. Baebius was stoned and forced to flee. He may be the same Marcus Baebius who was put to death by Marius in 87 BC.
- Gaius Baebius Tamphilus, appears on a coin of uncertain date.

=== Other Baebii of the Republic ===
- Quintus Baebius Herennius, tribune of the plebs in 216 BC. He was a relative by marriage of Gaius Terentius Varro, and actively supported his candidacy for the consulship against the senatorial elite, who objected to Varro's humble origins. According to Livy, Baebius criticized the emergence of a new elite forged from the patricians and plebeian nobiles, altering the traditional social structure.
- Lucius Baebius Dives, probably the same Lucius Baebius who was sent by Scipio Africanus as one of the ambassadors to Carthage in 203 BC. He was afterwards left by Scipio in command of the camp. Praetor in 189 BC, received Hispania Ulterior as his province, but was attacked by the Ligures on his journey, and died at Massilia.
- Marcus Baebius, one of the three commissioners sent into Macedonia in 186 BC, to investigate the charges brought by the Maronitae and others against Philip.
- Quintus Baebius Sulca, one of the ambassadors sent to Ptolemy VI Philometor of Egypt in 173 BC. He had probably been praetor in 175.
- Lucius Baebius, one of three commissioners sent into Macedonia in 169 BC, to inspect the state of affairs there, before Lucius Aemilius Paullus invaded the country.
- Aulus Baebius, a prefect under the command of Lucius Aemilius Paullus in 167 BC. He was left in command of a garrison at Demetrias, and became involved in the internal political struggles of the Aetolian League. He used Roman soldiers to surround a meeting of the Aetolian Senate, and allowed Aetolian soldiers to massacre five hundred and fifty attendees. Proscriptions and exiles followed. Paullus may have been complicit, for he received complaints circumspectly, took no action against the Aetolian leaders, and censured Baebius only for allowing Roman soldiers to take part. Baebius was afterwards condemned at Rome.
- Gaius Baebius, tribune of the plebs in 111 BC, bribed by Jugurtha to quash the investigation of Gaius Memmius.
- Gaius Baebius, appointed by Sextus Julius Caesar in 89 BC as his successor in the command of the Siege of Asculum during the Social War.
- Marcus Baebius, put to death by Marius and Cinna when they entered Rome in 87 BC. Instead of being killed by any weapon, Baebius was literally torn to pieces by the hands of his enemies.
- Marcus Baebius, a brave man, slain by order of Lucius Calpurnius Piso in Macedonia, in 57 BC.
- Aulus Baebius, an eques of Asta, in Hispania, deserted the Pompeian party in the Spanish War in 45 BC, and went over to Caesar.
- Baebius, a senator who served under Publius Vatinius in Illyria. On the murder of Caesar, in 44 BC, the Illyrians rose against Vatinius, and cut off Baebius and five cohorts which he commanded.
- Gaius Baebius, one of the military tribunes in 31 BC.

=== Baebii under the Empire ===
- Gaius Baebius Atticus, eques and governor of Noricum.
- Baebius Massa, formerly governor of Baetica, for the maladministration of which he was condemned in AD 93. He avoided punishment through the favour of the emperor Domitian, under whom he became a notorious informer.
- Lucius Baebius Avitus, enrolled in the senate by Vespasian, and procurator of Lusitania.
- Lucius Baebius Honoratus, consul suffectus in AD 85.
- Publius Baebius Italicus, consul suffectus in AD 90, and purported author of Ilias Latina.
- Lucius Baebius Tullius, consul suffectus in AD 95, and proconsul of Asia from 110 to 111.
- Quintus Baebius Macer, consul suffectus in AD 103, and praefectus urbi in 117.
- Baebius Marcellinus, aedile in 203 AD, was unjustly condemned to death under Septimius Severus, because by his baldness and senatorial rank, he vaguely resembled a man reported to have heard about a dream that the nurse of a certain Apronianus had once had, to the effect that Apronianus had become emperor.
- Lucius Baebius Juncinus, an equestrian officer, perhaps the father or grandfather of Lucius Baebius Aurelius Juncinus.
- Baebius Macrinus, a rhetorician, mentioned along with Julius Frontinus and Julius Granianus, as one of the teachers of the emperor Alexander Severus.
- Lucius Baebius Aurelius Juncinus, prefect of Egypt from AD 213 to 215.
- Baebius Macer, praetorian prefect during the reign of Valerian.
- Lucius Baebius Cassianus, of the tribus Voltinia in southern Gaul.

== See also ==
- List of Roman gentes

== Bibliography ==
=== Primary sources ===
- Polybius, Historiae (The Histories).
- Marcus Tullius Cicero, In Pisonem, Philippicae.
- Gaius Julius Caesar (attributed), De Bello Africo (On the African War).
- Gaius Sallustius Crispus (Sallust), Bellum Jugurthinum (The Jugurthine War).
- Titus Livius (Livy), History of Rome.
- Gaius Plinius Caecilius Secundus (Pliny the Younger), Epistulae (Letters).
- Decimus Junius Juvenalis, Satirae (Satires).
- Publius Cornelius Tacitus, Historiae; De Vita et Moribus Iulii Agricolae (On the Life and Mores of Julius Agricola).
- Lucius Annaeus Florus, Epitome de T. Livio Bellorum Omnium Annorum DCC (Epitome of Livy: All the Wars of Seven Hundred Years).
- Appianus Alexandrinus (Appian), Bellum Civile (The Civil War); Bella Illyrica (The Illyrian Wars).
- Lucius Cassius Dio Cocceianus (Cassius Dio), Roman History.
- Aelius Lampridius, Aelius Spartianus, Flavius Vopiscus, Julius Capitolinus, Trebellius Pollio, and Vulcatius Gallicanus, Historia Augusta (Lives of the Emperors).
- Sextus Aurelius Victor, De Viris Illustribus (On Famous Men).

=== Secondary sources ===
- La Carte Archéologique de la Gaule (Archaeological Map of Gaul, abbreviated CAG), Académie des Inscriptions et Belles-Lettres (1931–present).
- Françoise Des Boscs-Plateaux, Un parti hispanique à Rome?: ascension des élites hispaniques et pouvoir politique d'Auguste à Hadrien, Casa de Velázquez (2005).
- P.A. Brunt, "The Settlement of Marian Veterans", in The Fall of the Roman Republic and Related Essays, Clarendon Press, Oxford (1988, 2004)
- Jane D. Chaplin, Livy: Rome's Mediterranean Empire: Books Forty-One to Forty-Five and the Periochae, Oxford University Press (2007).
- George Davis Chase, "The Origin of Roman Praenomina", in Harvard Studies in Classical Philology, vol. VIII, pp. 103–184 (1897).
- Hermann Dessau, Inscriptiones Latinae Selectae (Select Latin Inscriptions, abbreviated ILS), Berlin (1892–1916).
- Paul A. Gallivan, "The Fasti for A. D. 70–96", in Classical Quarterly, vol. 31, pp. 186–220 (1981).
- John D. Grainger, The League of the Aitolians, Brill (1999).
- J.F. Lazenby, Hannibal's War: A Military History of the Second Punic War, University of Oklahoma Press (1978).
- Theodor Mommsen et alii, Corpus Inscriptionum Latinarum (The Body of Latin Inscriptions, abbreviated CIL), Berlin-Brandenburgische Akademie der Wissenschaften (1853–present).
- August Pauly, Georg Wissowa, et alii, Realencyclopädie der Classischen Altertumswissenschaft (Scientific Encyclopedia of the Knowledge of Classical Antiquities, abbreviated RE or PW), J. B. Metzler, Stuttgart (1894–1980).
- Elizabeth Rawson, "Sallust on the Eighties?" in Classical Quarterly, vol. 37 (1987).
- T. Robert S. Broughton, The Magistrates of the Roman Republic, American Philological Association (1952–1986).
- C. J. Smith, The Roman Clan: The gens from Ancient Ideology to Modern Anthropology, Cambridge University Press (2006).
- Dictionary of Greek and Roman Biography and Mythology, William Smith, ed., Little, Brown and Company, Boston (1849).
- William Linn Westermann, The Slave Systems of Greek and Roman Antiquity, American Philosophical Society (1955).
- Cambridge Ancient History, 2nd ed., vols. 8: "Rome and the Mediterranean to 133 B.C."; 9: "The Last Age of the Roman Republic, 146–43 B.C."; 11: "The High Empire A.D. 70–192", Cambridge University Press.
