= Quintus Fabius Postuminus =

Late 1st/early 2nd century Roman senator, consul and governor

Quintus Fabius Postuminus was a Roman senator who was suffect consul in the nundinum of May to August 96 with Titus Prifernius (possibly surnamed Paetus) as his colleague.

Because the last known member of the republican and Patrician family of the Fabii was Paullus Fabius Persicus who died in the reign of Claudius, it is likely that Postuminus is descended from one of the clientes or freedmen of that house. Ronald Syme notes that there are about 300 Fabii known in the Spanish provinces, as well as fifty in Gallia Narbonensis; so it is likely Postuminus' origins were in one of the Western provinces.

Experts once thought that Postuminus was legatus legionis of Legio XV Apollinaris, based on a reconstruction of an inscription found near Praeneste, but more recent analysis has shown this identification to be incorrect.

In the days following the assassination of Domitian, Postuminus was present in the Senate House when Pliny the Younger initiated his prosecution of Publicius Certus; Postuminus joined Lucius Domitius Apollinaris, Aulus Didius Gallus Fabricius Veiento, and Quintus Fulvius Gillo Bittius Proculus in defending Certius.

Postuminus was proconsular governor for two different provinces. He was governor of Moesia Inferior in 102/103, then almost a decade later was proconsular governor of Asia in 111/112, a position modern historians considered the acme of a senatorial career.

Political offices
Preceded by Gaius Manlius Valens; Gaius Antistius Vetus as ordinarii	Roman consul 96 (suffect) with Titus Prifernius	Succeeded by Tiberius Catius Caesius Fronto; Marcus Calpurnius [...]icus as suffecti
