= Ezekiel the Tragedian =

Egyptian actor

Ezekiel the Tragedian was an Egyptian actor who wrote and act in Alexandria. Naomi Yavneh dated his work to the 3rd century BCE, while Howard Jacobson estimates the 2nd century BCE. Evidence of the date is not definitive.

His only known work – Exagōgē ("The Exodus") – is the earliest known Jewish play. It survives in fragments found in the writings of Eusebius (PrEv 9, 28-29), Clement of Alexandria (Strom. 1.23.155f.), and Pseudo-Eustathius (Commentarius in Hexaemeron, PG 18, 729). Nevertheless, the extensive quotations by these writers make possible the assembly of 269 lines of text, about 20-25% of the whole. The only remnant of the Greco-Jewish poets which is more extensive is that found in the Sibylline Oracles.

Exagōgē is a five-act drama written in iambic trimeter, retelling of the biblical story of The Exodus from Egypt. Moses is the main character of the play, and parts of the biblical story have been altered to suit the narrative's needs. These changes probably point to Ezekiel's intention to stage the play, since certain scenes that are impossible to stage were converted into monologue. This drama is unique in blending the biblical story with the Hellenistic tragic drama; Erich S. Gruen writes that "the choice itself of that tale suggests an appeal to pride in national history and tradition produced in a quintessentially Hellenic mode."

The main modern edition is a parallel-text English-Greek edition by classical scholar Howard Jacobson. It was adapted by Edward Einhorn as a play/opera/immersive Passover seder, with music by Avner Finberg, for a production at La MaMa in 2024.

== Bibliography ==
- J. Allen, "Ezekiel the Tragedian on the Despoliation of Egypt," Journal for the Study of the Pseudepigrapha, 17.1 (2007), 3-19.
- Kristine J. Ruffatto, "Raguel as Interpreter of Moses' Throne Vision: The Transcendent Identity of Raguel in the Exagoge of Ezekiel the Tragedian", Journal for the Study of the Pseudepigrapha, 17.2 (2008), 121-139.
- Koskenniemi, Erkki, "Dramatic Miracles: Ezekiel the Tragedian", in: The Old Testament miracle-workers in early Judaism, Mohr Siebeck, 2005, pp. 64–88
- Brant, Jo-Ann A., "Mimesis and Dramatic Art in Ezekiel the Tragedians’ Exagoge", in: Ancient fiction: the matrix of early Christian and Jewish narrative, Society of Biblical Literature, 2005, pp: 129-148
- Jacobson, Howard, The Exagoge of Ezekiel, Cambridge University Press, 1983
