= Aulus Baebius =

1st-century BC Roman from Hispania

Aulus Baebius was a Roman eques of the town of Asta in Spain who deserted the Pompeian party during Julius Caesar's campaigns on the Iberian Peninsula, and went over to the side of Caesar in 45 BCE.
