= Quintus Quincy Quigley =

American lawyer (1828–1910)

Colonel Quintus Quincy Quigley (July 17, 1828 – December 19, 1910) was an American lawyer from Kentucky who was the founder of the city of Paducah. He kept a journal for nearly fifty years which has since been published as The Life and Times of Quintus Quincy Quigley. His house "Angles" was subsequently owned by US Vice President Alben W. Barkley and was added to the National Register of Historic Places in 1976.

== Early life and education ==
He was born to James and Martha Quigley in Paris, Tennessee, on July 17, 1828, and grew up in Milburn, Kentucky. He was educated at Cumberland College and studied law under Judge Crockett in Paducah, Kentucky, starting in 1848 and being admitted to the bar in 1850.

== Legal career ==
He practiced as an attorney in Ballard and McCracken counties. He was instrumental in establishing Paducah as a city, serving on its board of trustees and framing the charter which incorporated it in 1856. He became the first city attorney for Paducah. He formed a law firm, Quigley and Quigley, with his son Isaac who was also a lawyer and who became Chief Justice of the Kentucky Court of Appeals. They represented the Illinois Central Railroad for some time. Another case was that of Dessling who was sought for fraud. Quigley tried to extradite him to the Kingdom of Prussia but this was hotly contested and he was eventually released on a writ of habeas corpus. Quigley finally stopped practicing law when his son Isaac died and retired to the country.

== Angles ==
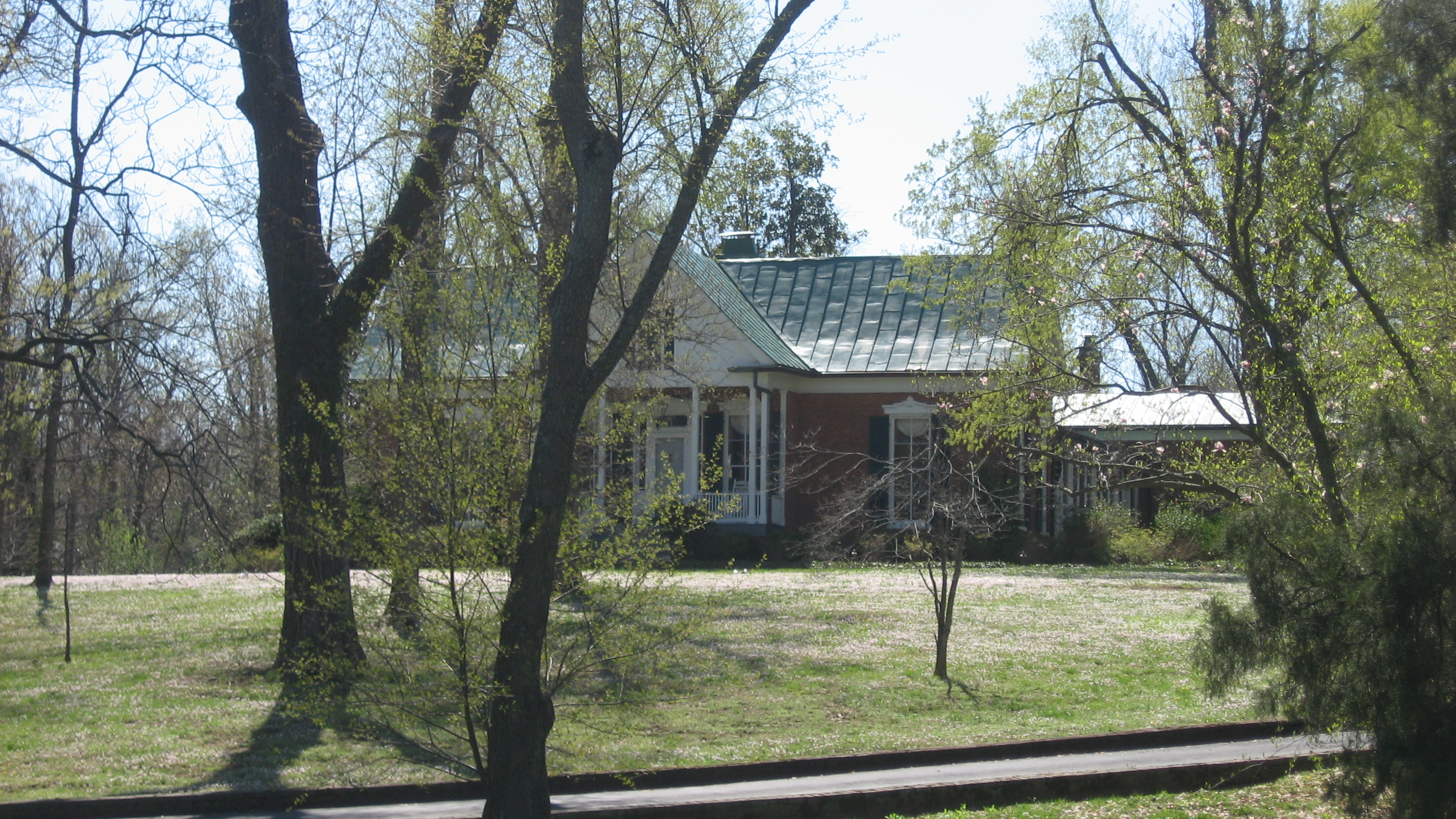
Angles in 2013

In 1868, he built the house "Angles", named after the sharp angles of its three tracts of land. The land cost $1,000 which had been allocated to buy a ring for his wife Mary. They could not find a ring she liked in Chicago, but they fell in love with the farmland and so bought it with the money instead. Construction of the house then cost $8,000 more which caused some financial difficulty.

The house was subsequently owned by Vice President Alben W. Barkley, who lived there from 1937 through 1956. Its address is now 540 Alben Barkley Drive, Paducah KY 42001 (37°3.628′N 88°38.856′W).

A historical marker sign was placed at the entrance in 1964. This describes the house as a "good example of Greek Revival architecture". It was added to the National Register of Historic Places in 1976. The nomination described it as a "distinctive amalgam of Federal, Grecian, Gothic, and even Italianate architectural elements" and that it has been designated as a "Gothic cottage".

== Journal ==
Portrait and signature published in The Lawyers and Lawmakers of Kentucky in 1897

He kept a detailed journal from 1859 to 1908. This was handwritten but was transcribed and published in a limited edition in 2000 as The Life and Times of Quintus Quincy Quigley. An example is his entry after arriving at Paducah,

We reached Paducah about sundown after a weary day's travel. I suffering more than the others but soon forgot about everything else in the sight of the river and other new features and facts of the wild. Paducah at this time was but a small town with perhaps five or six hundred population and mud holes, ravines and marshes all along Broadway to within half a square of the river.

== Personal life ==
He and his wife had six children. One child died in infancy and the others were Bruce, Isaac, Quintus, John and Mary Quintina who was known as "Ina". In his final years, he wintered with his daughter in Paducah, where he died from a congestive chill on December 19, 1910.

He was a freemason and a member of the Grace Episcopal church in which he served as a vestryman and superintendent of its Sunday school.

== See also ==
- Quintus et Ultimus Watson
