= Quintus Baebius Tamphilus =

Third Century BCE Roman statesman

Quintus Baebius Tamphilus (fl. late-3rd century BC) was a praetor of the Roman Republic who participated in negotiations with Hannibal attempting to forestall the Second Punic War.

Little is known of Baebius's life and political career, but it is likely that he held the praetorship before 218 BC. When Hannibal besieged Saguntum (now Sagunto), an ally of Rome, the Saguntines petitioned for assistance, and in response the Senate sent Baebius and Publius Valerius Flaccus as envoys to Spain, with instructions to demand that Hannibal leave Saguntum alone. They were then to proceed to Carthage to ask for his surrender as punishment for breaking the treaty that had been concluded at the end of the First Punic War. Turned back in Spain, the delegation got a hearing in the Carthaginian senate, but the Carthaginians supported Hannibal.

T.R.S. Broughton points out that the dating of the embassy is vexed. The Augustan-era historian Livy (21.6.3) seems to indicate that Valerius and Baebius were dispatched by the consuls of 218. Saguntum fell before the winter of 219–218, and since the envoys were supposed to have arrived before Hannibal's attack, the latest possible date is early 219. Dating based on Polybius points to a different story. "Probably deliberately," notes Dexter Hoyos, "Roman historical tradition afterwards distorted the facts about this embassy. … This story gathered increasingly implausible features as it went on."

In 218, Baebius was part of a delegation sent to Carthage with an ultimatum in expectation of declaring war. Livy notes that the five diplomatic legates were elder statesmen; they were all of consular rank except for the praetorian Baebius. The ambassadors then visited Spain and Gaul to recruit allies, with mixed results. Rome's failure to act more speedily on the diplomatic front allowed the war to expand into Gaul and Italy from Spain.

Quintus Baebius's sons Gnaeus and Marcus were consuls in an unusual instance of brothers holding the office successively (in 182 and 181 BC). The eldest son was probably the plebeian tribune Quintus Baebius who opposed going to war with Philip V of Macedon in 200 BC.

== See also ==
- Baebia (gens)
