= Quintus et Ultimus Watson =

American politician

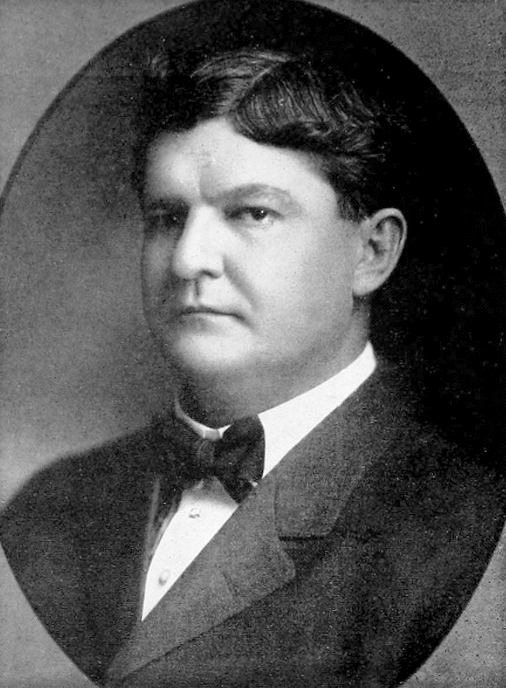

Acting Governor of Texas
- In office January 9, 1915
- Governor: Oscar Branch Colquitt

President pro tempore of the Texas Senate
- In office October 21, 1914 – January 12, 1915
- Nominated by: Claude Benton Hudspeth
- Preceded by: Charles Walter Taylor
- Succeeded by: Clinton West Nugent
- In office March 13, 1909 – 1909
- Nominated by: Charles Louis Brachfield
- Preceded by: James M. Terrell
- Succeeded by: Charles Louis Brachfield

Member of the Texas Senate from the 19th district
- In office January 8, 1907 – January 12, 1915
- Preceded by: Oliver Perry Storm
- Succeeded by: Paul DeWitt Page

Personal details
- Born: July 2, 1874 Burton, Texas, U.S.
- Died: November 14, 1929 (aged 55) Houston, Texas, U.S.
- Burial place: Oak Hill Cemetery, Burton, Texas, U.S.
- Education: A&M College of Texas
- Occupations: Lawyer; politician
- Political party: Democratic
- Spouse: Jessie Burton (m. 1897)

Quintus et Ultimus Watson (July 2, 1874 – November 14, 1929), also known as Q. U. Watson, was an American politician from Texas. He was a member of the Texas Senate from the 19th district. Watson served as the acting governor of Texas for one day, on January 9, 1915, when he was the president pro tempore of the Texas Senate, after lieutenant governor William Harding Mayes had resigned, and Governor Oscar Branch Colquitt was in Louisiana. He also was the acting Lieutenant Governor of Texas.

He was a member of the prominent Houston law firm of Garrison & Watson, which had an office in the State National Bank Building. Garrison & Watson were General Division Attorneys for the Southern Pacific Railroad and represented many of the largest corporations in Houston.

== Early life and education ==
Quintus et Ultimus Watson was born on July 2, 1874, in Burton, Texas, to Branch Archer Watson and Ann Amanda (née Gay) Watson. His father, B. A. Watson, was originally from Virginia and came to Texas around 1854. His mother Ann was the daughter of Thomas Gay, who came to Texas with Austin's Colony. Q. U. Watson was educated at the public schools of Washington County, Texas. After attending the Agricultural and Mechanical College of Texas near Bryan, he entered the law office of Searcy & Garrett. He was called to the bar in 1893.

== Career ==
Watson began his legal practice at Giddings, Texas, where he became a partner of the law firm of Rector & Harris under the renamed firm name of Rector, Harris & Watson. He became a member of the Texas Senate from the 19th district after taking the oath of office on January 8, 1907.

He was first elected president pro tempore of the Texas Senate on March 13, 1909, and was nominated by Charles Louis Brachfield. He was elected president pro tempore a second time on October 21, 1914, after being nominated by Claude Benton Hudspeth. On January 9, 1915, Watson became the acting governor of Texas. As president pro tempore, he was third in line of succession to the governor. Lieutenant Governor Mayes resigned in August 1914 to become the head of the journalism school at the University of Texas, and governor Colquitt was in Louisiana.

After he voluntarily retired from his senatorial career, he established himself as a respected lawyer in Houston. In 1922, he became associated with John T. Garrison and formed the law firm of Garrison & Watson. He continued in the law firm until his death in Houston on November 14, 1929. After his death, Simple Resolution No. 2 was passed unanimously in his honor by the 41st Texas Legislature.

== Personal life ==
He married Jessie Burton in Burton, Texas, in 1897. Watson was a respected member of the Houston Bar Association.

== See also ==
- Decimus et Ultimus Barziza
- Quintus Quincy Quigley

Political offices
| Preceded by Oscar Branch Colquitt | Governor of Texas; January 9, 1915 | Succeeded by Oscar Branch Colquitt |
Texas Senate
| Preceded by Oliver Perry Storm | Member of the Texas Senate from District 19; 1907–1915 | Succeeded by Paul DeWitt Page |
