= Quintus Baebius Sulca =

2nd century BC Roman praetor and envoy

Quintus Baebius Sulca was a Roman of the 2nd century BC. He probably served as praetor in 175 BC. Two years later he was sent in an envoy of five men to Macedonia and to Ptolemy VI in Alexandria.
