= Quintus Veranius (governor of Cappadocia) =

Roman governor of Cappadocia in 18 AD

Quintus Veranius was governor of Cappadocia in AD 18. He was involved in the prosecution of Gnaeus Calpurnius Piso, who was accused of poisoning Germanicus, in 20. After Piso's death in the same year, the emperor Tiberius conferred priesthoods on the prosecutors.
