= Sextus Papinius Allenius =

1st century Roman senator, general and consul

Sextus Papinius Allenius was a Roman senator of the First Century AD. He was a consul ordinarius in AD 36 with Quintus Plautius as his colleague. Allenius is known for introducing two fruits to Italy: jujube (zizipha) which he brought from Syria; and a variety of crabapple (tuber) which he found in Africa. According to Pliny the Elder, Allenius had grown them in his camp from slips; and he adds about the crabapple that "the fruit is more like a berry than an apple, but the trees make a particularly good decoration for terraces."

== Life and career ==
Allenius was a native of Patavium (modern Padua). Ronald Syme notes, "His second name may be presumed maternal" and notes two equestrian officers with similar names: Manius Allenius Crassus Caesonius, and [Al]lenius C.f. Strabo. Ségolène Demougin would go further, and agrees with D. McAlindon that Allenius was originally of the equestrian order, and admitted to the Senate upon becoming a quaestor between the years AD 15 and 20.

His career is known from a well-preserved inscription that is sparse in its details—which is typical for the early Principate. It records that Allenius was a military tribune (but not in which legion), quaestor, legatus under Tiberius, plebeian tribune, praetor, propraetorian legate for Tiberius, and then consul. He also held the priestly office of Quindecimviri sacris faciundis.

Syme offers some explication of these offices: the first time as legatus under Tiberius, Allenius was commander of a legion, although its identity is unknown; the date he was praetor is AD 27; the time as propraetorian legate was a governorship in one of the five praetorian provinces under imperial control. Syme also implies that Allenius owed his consulship to the influence of Lucius Vitellius.

"The Papinii met a rapid and melancholy end," writes Syme. Allenius had two sons: one son, also named Sextus Papinius, committed suicide in 37 to escape advances from his mother, who was subsequently called before the Senate to answer for her acts; the other son was put to death by Caligula.

Political offices
Preceded by Decimus Valerius Asiaticus, and Aulus Gabinius Secundus as Suffect consuls	Consul of the Roman Empire; 36 with Quintus Plautius	Succeeded by Gaius Vettius Rufus, and Marcus Porcius Cato as Suffect consuls
