= Quintus Plautius =

1st century AD Roman senator and consul

Quintus Plautius was a Roman senator, who was active during the Principate.

== Life ==
He was consul ordinarius for the year 36 as the colleague of Sextus Papinius Allenius. Nothing more is known about his senatorial career.

He was the son of Aulus Plautius, suffect consul in 1 BC, and Vitellia, possibly the grandaunt of the future Roman emperor Aulus Vitellius. Quintus had an older brother, Aulus Plautius suffect consul in 29 and conqueror of Roman Britain, and a sister, Plautia, who has been identified as the wife of Publius Petronius, consul in 19.

Although the name of his wife is not known, Quintus Plautius has been identified as the father of Plautius Lateranus, who was accused of an affair with Valeria Messalina in 48, and was executed in 65 for involvement in the Pisonian conspiracy. Another Aulus Plautius has been proposed to be his son. Suetonius writes that this man was murdered by Nero during the purges following the death of Poppaea Sabina in 65. Nero, before he put Aulus Plautius to death, subjected him to oral rape, after which he is said to have gloated, 'Now let my mother go and kiss my successor'; the suggestion being that Agrippina (though she had been murdered in 59) had encouraged him to take Nero's position as Emperor.

Political offices
| Preceded by Decimus Valerius Asiaticus, and Aulus Gabinius Secundus as Suffect consuls | Suffect consul of the Roman Empire; 36 with Sextus Papinius Allenius | Succeeded by Gaius Vettius Rufus, and Marcus Porcius Cato as Suffect consuls |
