= Galeria gens =

Ancient Roman family

The gens Galeria was a Roman family of Imperial times. The family first rose to prominence under the Julio-Claudian dynasty, but the most illustrious person of the name was the emperor Galerius, one of the heirs of Diocletian, who reigned from AD 305 to 311, although he cannot have been a direct descendant of the earlier family.

== Branches and cognomina ==
The only surnames associated with the early Galerii are Fundanus and Trachalus, but it is not known whether they were personal cognomina, or whether they instead represented distinct families within the gens.

== Members ==
- Galeria Copiola, a dancer during the late Republic. She made her debut in 82 BC, and was retired by 55, but was still living in AD 9, at the age of 104.
- Gaius Galerius, prefect of Egypt from AD 16 to 31, during the reign of Tiberius; he was the brother-in-law of Seneca the Elder.
- Galeria Fundana, of a praetorian family, was the second wife of the emperor Vitellius, who died in AD 69.
- Publius Galerius Trachalus, a respected orator, he was consul in AD 68, and subsequently advisor to the emperor Otho. During the reign of Vitellius, he was protected by his relative, Galeria Fundana, the emperor's wife; he may have been proconsul of Africa under Vespasian.
- Galerius Valerius Maximianus, emperor from AD 305 to 311.
- Galerius Valerius Maximinus Daza, emperor from AD 310 to 313.

== See also ==
- List of Roman gentes

== Bibliography ==
- Gaius Plinius Secundus (Pliny the Elder), Historia Naturalis (Natural History).
- Publius Cornelius Tacitus, Historiae.
- Marcus Fabius Quintilianus (Quintilian), Institutio Oratoria.
- Gaius Suetonius Tranquillus, De Vita Caesarum (Lives of the Caesars, or The Twelve Caesars).
- Lucius Cassius Dio, Roman History.
- Aelius Lampridius, Aelius Spartianus, Flavius Vopiscus, Julius Capitolinus, Trebellius Pollio, and Vulcatius Gallicanus, Historia Augusta (Augustan History).
- Dictionary of Greek and Roman Biography and Mythology, William Smith, ed., Little, Brown and Company, Boston (1849).
- Alan K. Bowman, Egypt After the Pharaohs, 332 BC-AD 642: From Alexander to the Arab Conquest, University of California Press (1986, 1996).
- The Oxford Companion to Classical Civilization, Simon Hornblower, Antony Spawforth, Esther Eidinow, eds., Oxford University Press (1998).
