= Publius Vitellius the Elder =

Roman procurator during the reign of Augustus

Publius Vitellius, grandfather of the emperor Vitellius, was a Roman eques, who served as procurator during the reign of Augustus.

== Family ==
Vitellius was born at Nuceria Apulorum (Luceria) or possibly at Nuceria Alfaterna, perhaps the son of the Quintus Vitellius who was a quaestor under Augustus. His sister, Vitellia, married Aulus Plautius, consul suffectus in 1 BC. He had four sons: Lucius, the father of the emperor, had a distinguished military career, and was consul in AD 34. Publius was also a distinguished soldier, serving on the staff of Germanicus. He was arrested following the downfall of Sejanus, and died in confinement. Aulus was consul suffectus in AD 32, and died in office. Quintus was a senator, whom the emperor deprived of his rank.

== See also ==
- Vitellia gens

== Bibliography ==
- Fasti Ostienses, CIL XIV, 244.
- Publius Cornelius Tacitus, Annales.
- Gaius Suetonius Tranquillus, De Vita Caesarum (Lives of the Caesars, or The Twelve Caesars).
- Marina Silvestrini, Le tribù romane. Atti della XVIe Rencontre sur l’épigraphie (The Roman Tribes. Acts of the 26th Encounter on Epigraphy), Bari (2010).
