= Sextilia =

Mother of emperor Vitellius

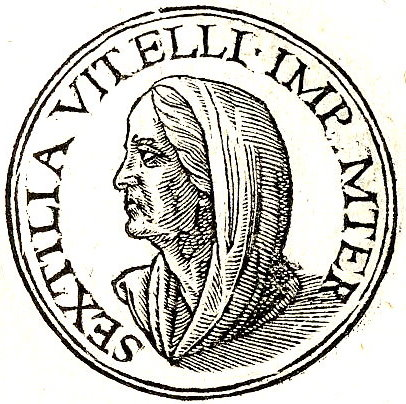
Sextilia from Promptuarii Iconum Insigniorum

Sextilia (c. 5 BC – 69) was the mother of Lucius Vitellius the Younger and Aulus Vitellius.

== Family ==
Sextilia came from a distinguished family and lived intimately with imperial intrigue, daughter of Marcus Sextilius, Triumvir Monetalis around 15, and Fabia, daughter of Publius Fabius, and paternal granddaughter of Quintus Sextilius, himself the son of Senator Publius Sextilius, mentioned in 39 BC and 35 BC, paternal grandson of another Publius Sextilius and great-grandson of yet another Publius Sextilius.

Sextilia married the successful politician and friend of the emperor Claudius, Lucius Vitellius. Placed in charge of Rome while Claudius traveled to Britain, Vitellius died in 52 CE leaving Sextilia with two sons, Aulus Vitellius and the younger Lucius Vitellius.

== Aulus becomes emperor ==
Sextilia and Galeria Fundana remained in Rome after Aulus Vitellius went to Germany. Although he left Galeria in straitened financial circumstances with creditors at her door, Sextilia retained a firm control over her wealth and distanced herself from her son's financial debacle. After the death of Galba, on 2 January 69 CE the troops in Lower Germany declared Vitellius emperor.

More in response to Vitellius's loose regard for discipline than as a measure of his leadership qualities, the troops hailed him a second Germanicus, in reference to the able soldier and son of the younger Antonia who was Tiberius's probable heir. When Sextilia first learned of her son's rise to power, she was said to have responded that she had borne a libertine Vitellius, not a Germanicus.

== Death ==
In Rome, Sextilia and Galeria Fundana were in some danger as Marcus Salvius Otho challenged Vitellius. Vitellius wrote to Otho's brother and threatened to kill him and his family if the women were harmed. As it turned out, Sextilia may have had her avenues of access to the camp of Otho, and neither of them was injured.

Vitellius defeated Otho, and on his arrival in Rome, he embraced Sextilia and declared her Augusta. He also spent huge sums of money on food, drink, and entertainment. Troops in other parts of the empire deserted to Titus Flavius Vespasian. Vitellius was defeated in battle. Sextilia died shortly before both her sons were killed in December 69; Vitellius is even reported to have starved his mother to death—to fulfill a prophecy that he would rule longer if his mother died first; alternatively there is a report that his mother asked for poison to commit suicide—a request he granted.

== Sources ==
- Continuité gentilice et continuité sénatoriale dans les familles sénatoriales romaines à l'époque impériale, 2000
