= Galerian =

Galerian may refer to:

- Galerians, a 1999 horror video game
- Galerian Mammal Age, a European land mammal age corresponding to the Middle Pleistocene
- Galerian tribe, the early people of Lugdunum (now Lyon, France)

== See also ==
- Galeria (disambiguation)
- Galerina
