= Vitellia gens =

Ancient Roman family

The gens Vitellia was a family of ancient Rome, which rose from obscurity in imperial times, and briefly held the Empire itself in AD 69. The first of this gens to obtain the consulship was Aulus Vitellius, uncle of the emperor Vitellius, in AD 32.

== Origin ==
Suetonius relates two conflicting accounts of the Vitellii, which he ascribes to the emperor's flatterers and his detractors, respectively. According to the first account, the family was descended from Faunus, King of the Aborigines, and Vitellia, who ruled over Latium in the distant past, and were later regarded as two of the indigenous deities. The Vitellii were Sabines, who migrated to Rome under the monarchy, and were enrolled among the patricians. One family of the Vitellii settled at Nuceria Apulorum (Luceria) or possibly at Nuceria Alfaterna in the time of the Samnite Wars, and it was from this family that the emperor Vitellius was sprung.

A less flattering story reports that the emperor's family was descended from a freedman, a cobbler according to Cassius Severus. His son was a delator, who earned his fortune selling confiscated property, and married a wanton woman, the daughter of a baker named Antiochus. With the help of these ill-gotten gains, his grandson became an eques.

Suetonius offers no opinion on which of these accounts is true, other than to say that Publius Vitellius of Nuceria, the emperor's grandfather, was indeed an eques, that he was entrusted with administering the property of Augustus, and that he left four sons, who all made names for themselves in the Roman aristocracy. There were certainly Vitellii mentioned in connection with the earliest days of the Republic, and it is not unlikely that they were patrician, but whether the Vitellii of the Empire were descended from them cannot be determined. There was also an ancient town of Vitellia in Latium, (Note: It is not entirely clear whether Vitellia was a Latin town, a Roman colony, or an Aequian settlement. Livy speaks of it as one of the towns taken by Coriolanus in 488 BC, implying that it was either a Roman settlement or one of Rome's Latin allies; but Dionysius and Plutarch, who give more detailed accounts of Coriolanus' campaign, do not mention it, nor does Dionysius list it as one of the cities of the Latin League. In 393 BC, Livy describes it as a Roman colony in the territory of the Aequi, who captured it in a night attack. Pliny lists it among the towns of Latium that no longer existed in his day, the first century AD.) and a road, the Via Vitellia, leading from the Janiculum to the sea.

== Praenomina ==
The Vitellii who appear in history used the praenomina Publius, Quintus, Aulus, and Lucius, all of which were very common at all periods. From inscriptions, some of the family must also have used Gaius.

== Members ==
This list includes abbreviated praenomina. For an explanation of this practice, see filiation.

- Vitellia, wife of Lucius Junius Brutus, one of the first consuls at the beginning of the Republic, in 509 BC.
- The Vitellii, two senators, nephews of Lucius Tarquinius Collatinus, and brothers-in-law of Brutus, who conspired with their cousins, the three Aquillii, and two of the sons of Brutus, to restore the Tarquins to the throne.
- Quintus Vitellius, one of the duumviri jure dicundo at Ostia in 47 and 45 BC.
- Aulus Vitellius, duumvir jure dicundo at Ostia in 46 BC.
- Quintus Vitellius, a quaestor, probably under Augustus; it is uncertain how or whether he was related to Publius Vitellius, the grandfather of the emperor, and even the era of the Quintus Vitellius referred to is uncertain in this passage.
- Quintus Vitellius Q. f., son of Quintus Vitellius and Bassa, buried at Rome in the late first century BC or early first century AD.
- Publius Vitellius, procurator under Augustus, was the grandfather of the emperor.
- Vitellia, the wife of Aulus Plautius, consul suffectus in 1 BC, and mother of Aulus Plautius, the conqueror and first governor of Britain. She was the mother-in-law of Publius Petronius, consul suffectus in AD 19.
- Lucius Vitellius P. f., father of the emperor, was consul in AD 34, and afterward governor of Syria, where his successes excited the jealousy of Caligula. Vitellius evaded certain death by clever flattery, and became one of the chief supporters of Claudius, along whom he served as consul in 43 and 47, and censor in 48. He died in 52, and was buried with great honours.
- Publius Vitellius P. f., an officer who served under Germanicus in his campaigns against the Chatti. He prosecuted Gnaeus Calpurnius Piso for the murder of Germanicus, but in AD 31 he was accused as one of the associates of Sejanus, and perished before he could be brought to trial.
- Aulus Vitellius P. f., consul suffectus from the Kalends of July in AD 32, is said to have been given to luxury and extravagant feats. He died during his term of office.
- Quintus Vitellius P. f., a senator, deprived of his rank by Tiberius, who ostensibly wished to rid the senate of those who squandered their fortunes and led dissolute lives.
- Aulus Vitellius A. f. (P. n.), probably the son of Aulus Vitellius, the consul of AD 32, named on a monument dedicated to his father.
- Vitellius Proculus, a soldier in the army of Publius Petronius, governor of Syria in AD 39.
- Lucius Vitellius L. f. P. n., brother of the emperor, was consul suffectus from the Kalends of July in AD 48, the year in which his father and the emperor Claudius were censors. In the Year of the Four Emperors, he mounted a formidable campaign in support of his brother, but the collapse of Vitellian support at Rome sealed his fate; he was captured and put to death by Vespasian.
- Aulus Vitellius L. f. P. n., consul in AD 48, and subsequently proconsul of Africa. He was proclaimed emperor by the soldiers on the death of Otho in 69, but overthrown by Vespasian in the same year.
- Publius Vitellius Saturninus, prefect of one of Otho's legions.
- Vitellius A. f. L. n. Petronianus, son of the emperor Vitellius by his first wife, Petronia. According to Suetonius, he was blind in one eye, and would inherit a fortune from his mother upon adulthood; Vitellius manumitted him, and was widely believed to have poisoned him, claiming that Petronianus had intended to kill his father, but had then taken the poison himself out of remorse.
- Vitellius A. f. L. n. Germanicus, son of the emperor by his second wife, Galeria Fundana, was six years old when his father claimed the throne. After the Vitellians had been defeated, Vespasian's ally, Mucianus, had him put to death, in order to preclude his use in future rebellions. Suetonius reports that he was severely afflicted by a stammer.
- Vitellia, daughter of the emperor, and wife of Decimus Valerius Asiaticus, consul designatus for AD 70. When her husband died before entering his consulship, the emperor Vespasian arranged for her to remarry, and provided her with a dowry. Her son, Decimus Valerius Asiaticus Saturninus, was consul suffectus in AD 94.
- Quintus Vitellius Eclogius, (Note: Casaubon supplies the nomen Vitellius; in Suetonius he is described simply as "Quintus Eclogius" or "Eulogius" (depending on the manuscript), and prepared his genealogy for a quaestor named Quintus Vitellius.) supposed by Casaubon to have been a freedman of the emperor Vitellius, and the author of the genealogy referred to by Suetonius at the beginning of his "Life of Vitellius". It is unclear from the original passage precisely when this genealogy was compiled, although it could be interpreted as referring to individuals living during the time of Augustus.
- Vitellia C. f. Rufilla, the wife of Gaius Salvius Liberalis, consul suffectus in AD 85.
- Publius Vitellius Saturninus, one of the Arval Brethren in AD 122, possibly a son of the Vitellius Saturninus who served under Otho.
- Vitellius, a legal writer, mentioned several times by Ulpian.
- Vitellius Honoratus, summoned to Rome as a witness against Marius Priscus, proconsul of Africa in AD 100. He was accused of bribing Priscus to exile an eques, and put seven of his friends to death, by the payment of three hundred thousand sestertii, but Honoratus died before he could testify.
- Vitellius, consul suffectus in AD 189.
- Marcus Flavius Vitellius Seleucus, consul in AD 221.
- Flavia Vitellia Seleuciana, a woman from a senatorial family, probably the daughter of Vitellius Seleucus, the consul of AD 221.

== See also ==
- List of Roman gentes

== Bibliography ==
- Titus Livius (Livy), History of Rome.
- Flavius Josephus, Antiquitates Judaïcae (Antiquities of the Jews).
- Gaius Plinius Caecilius Secundus (Pliny the Younger), Epistulae (Letters).
- Publius Cornelius Tacitus, Annales, Historiae.
- Plutarchus, Lives of the Noble Greeks and Romans.
- Gaius Suetonius Tranquillus, De Vita Caesarum (Lives of the Caesars, or The Twelve Caesars).
- Lucius Cassius Dio Cocceianus (Cassius Dio), Roman History.
- Louis-Sébastien Le Nain de Tillemont, Histoire des Empereurs et des Autres Princes qui ont Régné Durant les Six Premiers Siècles de l’Église (History of the Emperors and Other Princes who Ruled During the First Six Centuries of the Church), Chez Rollin Fils, Paris (1690–1697, 1701, 1738).
- Dictionary of Greek and Roman Biography and Mythology, William Smith, ed., Little, Brown and Company, Boston (1849).
- Dictionary of Greek and Roman Geography, William Smith, ed., Little, Brown and Company, Boston (1854).
- Paul von Rohden, Elimar Klebs, & Hermann Dessau, Prosopographia Imperii Romani (The Prosopography of the Roman Empire, abbreviated PIR), Berlin (1898).
- Marina Silvestrini, Le tribù romane. Atti della XVIe Rencontre sur l’épigraphie (The Roman Tribes. Acts of the 26th Encounter on Epigraphy), Bari (2010).
