= Publius Vitellius the Younger =

First-century Roman commander under Germanicus and politician

Publius Vitellius was a first-century Roman commander under Germanicus. He was the son of the eques Publius Vitellius, and belonged to the gens Vitellia. The emperor Vitellius was his nephew.

== Career ==
In AD 15, Vitellius accompanied Germanicus on his second campaign in Germania. During the retreat, Germanicus handed over command of the second and fourteenth legions to Vitellius. The journey back was disastrous, however, with many of the units' troops drowned in a flood. One year later, while Germanicus was preparing for his third and largest campaign in Germania, he sent Vitellius and Gaius Antius to Gaul to collect taxes. On Germanicus' suspicious death in the year 19, Vitellius was among the prosecutors of Gnaeus Calpurnius Piso, who was accused of having poisoned Germanicus, and who took his own life once he despaired of acquittal. Tacitus praises Vitellius' eloquence in the trial.

Vitellius was later among the supporters of Sejanus, and upon the latter's downfall in the year 31, Vitellius was also indicted for complicity, having been Sejanus' prefect of the military treasury. Vitellius was given into the custody of his brother (Suetonius does not say which one), where anticipating the worst, he opened his veins with a penknife. Tacitus writes simply that Publius died, but Suetonius states that he was persuaded by pleas from his family and friends to be bandaged and treated; however, he died soon afterward from natural causes.

His wife, Acutia, was accused and convicted of maiestas in AD 37. Shortly afterward, her accuser, the delator Decimus Laelius Balbus, was himself condemned and banished.

== Bibliography ==
- Publius Cornelius Tacitus, Annales.
- Gaius Suetonius Tranquillus, De Vita Caesarum (Lives of the Caesars, or The Twelve Caesars).
