= Woman of the Chatti =

Alleged Germanic seeress of the Chattian tribe

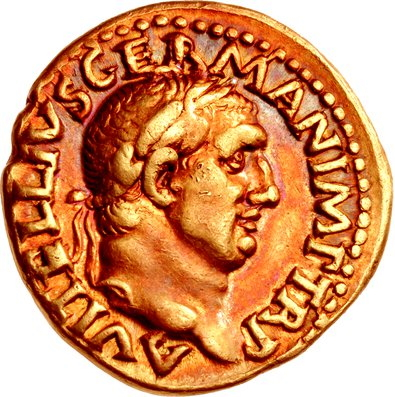
Vitellius on a contemporary coin

The Woman of the Chatti (Latin: Chatta mulier), or the Chattian seeress, is an alleged Germanic seeress of the Chattian tribe who according to Suetonius prophesied that Roman Emperor Vitellius (ruled in 69 AD) would reign for a long time if he survived his mother Sextilia. This would have led to Vitellius murdering his aged mother by poison or starvation. No such seeress is mentioned by other sources, and so it may have been a malevolent rumour to justify the coup d'état by Vespasian.

Vitellius did however stay in Cologne near Chattian territory earlier in the year when he became emperor, and may have consulted with a seeress from that tribe.

== Matricide ==
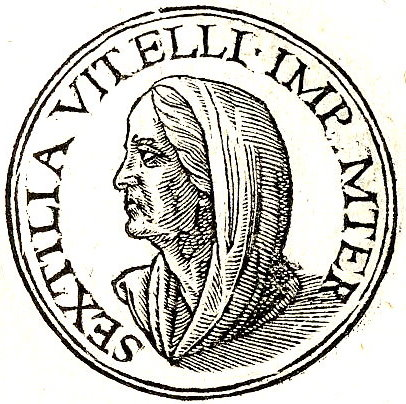
Sextilia from Promptuarii Iconum Insigniorum

Around 100 AD, Suetonius wrote that the Roman emperor Vitellius trusted in the prophecies of his seeress, from the Chatti tribe (vaticinante Chatta muliere, cui velut oraculo adquiescebat (Vit. 14,5)). This was one of the vices attributed to him, and he was also described as a cruel and gluttonous emperor. His seeress promised him a secure and long rule if he would survive his mother Sextilia, and therefore he would have arranged so that his mother died of starvation when she was ill. However, he may also have poisoned her.

Suspectus et in morte matris fuit, quasi aegrae praeberi cibum prohibuisset, vaticinante Chatta muliere, cui velut oraculo adquiescebat, ita demum firmiter ac diutissime imperaturum, si superstes parenti exstitisset. Alii traduiit ipsam taedio praesentium et imminentium metu venenum a filio impetrasse, haud sane difficulter.

Moreover, when his mother died, he was suspected of having forbidden her being given food when she was ill, because a woman of the Chatti, in whom he believed as he would in an oracle, prophesied that he would rule securely and for a long time, but only if he should survive his parent. Others say that through weariness of present evils and fear of those which threatened, she asked poison of her son, and obtained it with no great difficulty. (Rolfe's translation).

He was also suspected of involvement in his mother's death by ordering that she should not be given food when she was ill, because a woman of the Chatti, to whom he listened as if she were an oracle, had predicted that his rule would be assured and long-lasting, provided he survived the death of his mother. Others record that it was she, weary of present evils and fearful of those to come, who demanded poison from her son—which he willingly gave her. (Edwards' translation).

According to some accounts, a prophet of the Chatti, a woman whom Vitellius credited with oracular powers, had promised him a long and secure reign if he outlived his mother; so when she fell sick, he had her starved to death. Another version of the story is that his mother, grown weary of the present and apprehensive of the torture, begged him for a supply of poison; a request which he was not slow to grant. (Graves' translation).

== Historicity ==
Rhine frontier of the Roman empire, 70 AD, showing the location of Cologne where Vitellius was governor, north-west of the Chattian territories. Roman territory shaded dark

There is however no evidence that Sextilia died of unnatural causes, because in 69 AD, she was an infirm woman of about 70. Moreover, Suetonius did not vouch for the information and he only mentions it as a suspicion, and Suetonius is known to have added scandalous rumours in his works.

Vitellius did however, spend a short period as governor of Lower Germania between 1 December 68 and 2 January 69. When Nero committed suicide, on 9 June 68, the empire was politically unstable and Vitellius with his four legions had potential to influence the course of events, for his own benefit or for that of others. He was consequently liable to ask for advice from a range of possible advisors, such as friends and associates, and soothsayers. Vitellius had his headquarters in Cologne (Colonia Claudia Ara Agrippinensium), which was close to the territories of the Chattian tribe, so he may also have consulted people from Germanic tribes who lived in Colonia. It is possible that malicious tongues who learnt of his solicitations distorted the information and combined it with rumours of a matricide, when he had risen to the position of emperor. The information about the alleged matricide may have been forged by Flavian supporters in order to justify the coup d'état by Vespasian.

There is no mention of a Chatta mulier in the writings of Tacitus and he would not have missed the opportunity to include it. So the information probably goes back to a source that was not considered trustworthy. The only retrievable fact may be that Suetonius and his contemporaries considered the Chatti to have seeresses.

== Sources ==
- Bruder, Reinhold (1974). Die germanische Frau im Lichte der Runeninschriften und der antiken Historiographie. De Gruyter. doi:10.1515/9783110838367. ISBN 978-3-11-004152-1.
- Morris, Katherine (1991). Sorceress Or Witch?: The Image of Gender in Medieval Iceland and Northern Europe. University Press of America. ISBN 978-0-8191-8257-9.
- Okamura, Lawrence (1995). "Germanic seeresses through Roman eyes". Classica – Revista Brasileira de Estudos Clássicos. 7: 285–299. doi:10.24277/classica.v7i0.678.
- Samplonius, Kees (2013) [1995]. "From Veleda to the Völva". In Mulder-Bakker, Anneke (ed.). Sanctity and Motherhood: Essays on Holy Mothers in the Middle Ages. Routledge. ISBN 978-1-134-81949-2.
- Schuhmann, R. (2006). Geographischer Raum und Lebensform der Germanen : Kommentar zu Tacitus' Germania, c. 1–20 (PDF) (Thesis). Jena.
- Suetonius Tranquillus, G. (1914). Suetonius. Vol. II. Translated by Rolfe, John Carew. Harvard University Press.
- Suetonius Tranquillus, G. (1989). Grant, M. (ed.). The Twelve Caesars. Translated by Graves, Robert. Penguin Books.
- Suetonius Tranquillus, G. (2000). Lives of the Caesars. Translated by Edwards, C. Oxford University Press. ISBN 978-0-19-953756-3.
