= Galeria =

Galeria may refer to:

- Galeria gens, an ancient Roman family
- Galeria Copiola, a Roman actress during the 1st century BC
- Galeria Valeria, Roman empress from 305 to 311
- Galéria, a commune on the French island of Corsica
- Galeria Karstadt Kaufhof, a chain of European department stores

== See also ==
- Galerians
