= Publius Galerius Trachalus =

First century AD Roman senator, consul and provincial governor

Publius Galerius Trachalus was a Roman senator, who was active during the middle of the first century AD. He was consul for the year 68 as the colleague of Silius Italicus and a noted Roman orator praised by Quintilian.

Hailing from Ariminum, Trachalus is thought to possibly be a descendant of the equites Gaius Galerius, praefectus or governor of Egypt (AD 16–23). He was also likely related to Galeria Fundana, the second wife of Vitellius.

An inscription from Mediolanum (modern Milan), now lost, attests that Trachalus had been co-opted into the Septemviri epulones, one of the four most prestigious ancient Roman priesthoods. Trachalus' skill in oratory and at the bar led Otho, upon becoming Emperor during the Year of the Four Emperors (AD 69), to make him an advisor. With the suicide of Otho and the advent of his rival Vitellius to Rome and imperial power, Trachalus' life was in danger. Here he was protected by Vitellius's wife Galeria. He evaded further danger in that tumultuous year and was permitted to be governor of Africa proconsularis for the term 78/79.

Political offices
Preceded by Appius Annius Gallus, and Lucius Verulanus Severus as Suffect consuls	Consul of the Roman Empire; 68 with Silius Italicus	Succeeded by Nero V, and ignotus as Suffect consul
