= Gaius Galerius =

Roman Governor of Roman Egypt (r.16 AD-32 AD)

Gaius Galerius (died AD 32) was a Roman eques who was active during the reign of Tiberius. He is best known as the praefectus or governor of Egypt (16-32).

Galerius came of a prominent family of Ariminum. He has been identified as the husband of the sister of Helvia, mother of Seneca the Younger. During his tenure, in the year 19 Germanicus visited the province in violation of the laws that no senator or eques could enter Egypt without explicit permission of the Emperor. Another event Galerius presided over was the periodic census for the province in 21/22; a surviving papyrus document attests that it was carried out.

Some years after Galerius took up the posting in Egypt, Seneca came to live with his and his wife in Alexandria, where the boy stayed for a number of years. When the three of them sailed back to Rome in AD 32, Galerius perished in a shipwreck; according to Seneca, his wife recovered Galerius' body and buried it.

It has been speculated that Galerius may be the ancestor, if not the father, of Publius Galerius Trachalus, consul in 68. Both have a connection to Ariminum, and belong to the Roman voting tribe Aniensis. This would mean Galerius was also related somehow to Galeria Fundana, although Suetonius reports she was the daughter of an unnamed senator who had achieved the traditional Republican magistracy of praetor. However, that Seneca fails to mention any descendants of Galerius in his surviving writings weakens that possibility; another possibility would be that Trachalus and Fundana are related to Galerius through an unrecorded brother or uncle.

== Notes ==
Political offices
| Preceded by Aemilius Rectus | Prefect of Aegyptus; 16-32 | Succeeded by Vitrasius Pollio |
