= Vitellia (daughter of emperor Vitellius) =

Daughter of 1st century Roman emperor Vitellius

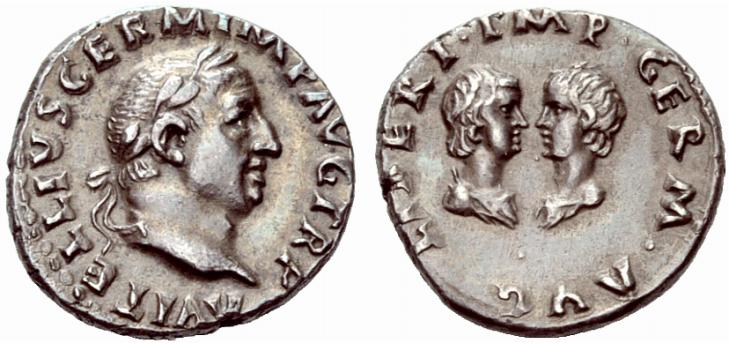
- Coin depicting Vitellia, her father and brother
- Known for: daughter of the Roman emperor Vitellius
- Spouse(s): Decimus Valerius Asiaticus; Libo Rupilius Frugi
- Children: Marcus Lollius Paullinus Decimus Valerius Asiaticus Saturninus; Rupilia Faustina
- Parents: Vitellius (father); Galeria Fundana (mother)

Vitellia (Note: Her full name may have been Vitellia Galeria or Vitellia Galeria Fundana/Fundania.) was a Roman noblewoman, who was the daughter of the emperor Aulus Vitellius and was married to the Roman senator Decimus Valerius Asiaticus. A fictionalised Vitellia is a central character in the opera La clemenza di Tito by Mozart.

== Biography ==
Vitellia was the daughter of the emperor Aulus Vitellius, born from his second marriage to Galeria Fundana. Vitellia had a brother, Vitellius Germanicus and a half-brother Vitellius Petronianus, who was the son of Vitellius' first wife, Petronia. In 69, Vitellius began to struggle for power, and at this time Vitellia was in Rome with her mother. Whilst her father was away at war, she and the rest of her family came under the protection of the emperor Otho. After the first Battle of Bedriacum, where Vitellius defeated Otho, his wife and children joined him in Lugdunum.

According to Tacitus, Vitellius chose the legate of the Belgian province Decimus Valerius Asiaticus as a husband for Vitellia. Vitellia's father was assassinated in 69 and in 70 Asiaticus died, leaving her with a son, Marcus Lollius Paullinus Decimus Valerius Asiaticus Saturninus. Later in 70, the new emperor Vespasian took Vitellia under his wing, provided her with a dowry, a house and an unnamed husband. Some historians such as Settipani and Strachan have proposed that he was Libo Rupilius Frugi and that she was the mother of his daughter Rupilia Faustina, thus explaining the use of the nomen Galeria among female members of the Nerva–Antonine dynasty.

== Fictional portrayal ==
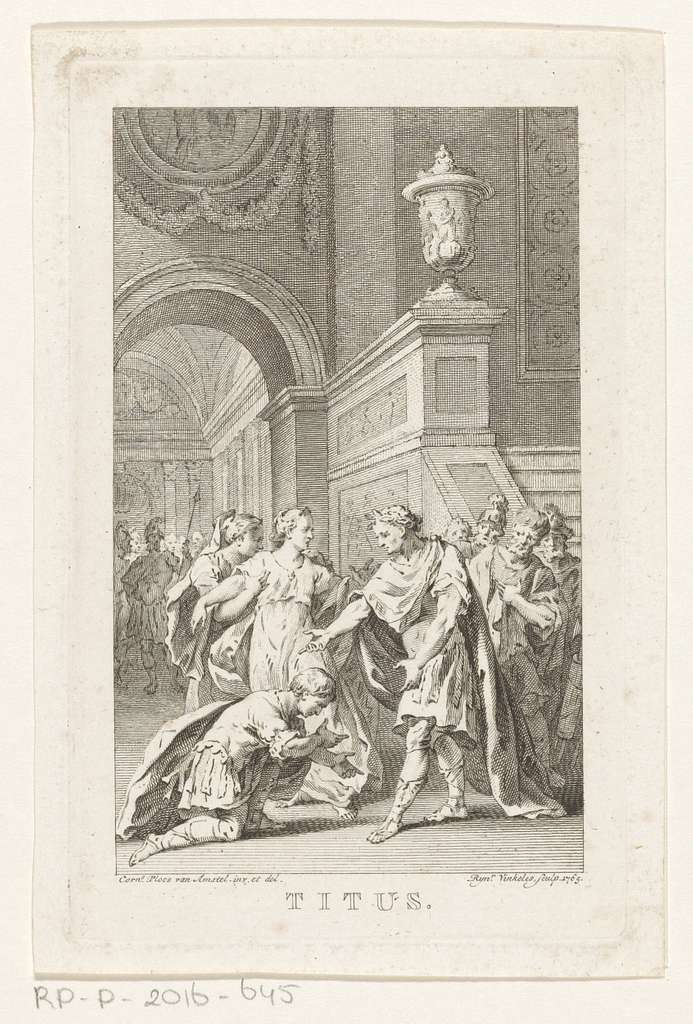
Sextus kneels before Emperor Titus. Behind them, Vitellia falls into Tullia's arms. Before the people Titus shows his mild character and gives the two freedom after their betrayal.

Vitellia is a central character in Mozart's La clemenza di Tito, where a dramatic account of her life has her attempt to assassinate Titus, after he declares his love for the Jewish princess Berenice. The opera is set in 79.
