= Galeria Fundana =

Roman empress in 69 AD

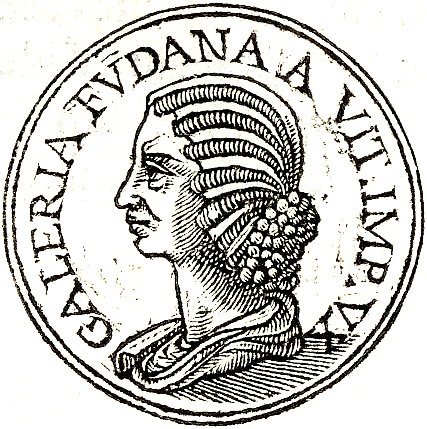
- Imaginary depiction of Galeria Fundana from Promptuarii Iconum Insigniorum

Roman empress
- Tenure: 69
- Spouse: Vitellius
- Issue: Vitellius; Vitellia
Names
- Galeria Fundana

Galeria Fundana (c. 40 – aft. 69) was a Roman empress and the second wife of Roman emperor Vitellius.

== Biography ==
=== Early life ===
Suetonius tells us that Galeria was the daughter of an ex-praetor and bore two children during her marriage: a son and a daughter. Gwyn Morgan assumes she was related to Publius Galerius Trachalus, "Otho's alleged speechwriter".

=== Empress ===
Tacitus, who writes unfavourably about Vitellius, claims that Galeria was a woman of "exemplary virtue" who "took no part in [Vitellius's] horrors." Tacitus specifically notes she protected Galerius Trachalus from her husband when he purged the supporters of his defeated rival Otho.

=== Later life ===
Her son Vitellius, renamed Germanicus by his father in 69, was killed after supporters of Vespasian took control of Rome, together with Vitellius himself. Galeria's life was spared and she was allowed to bury her husband. Her daughter Vitellia married twice: Decimus Valerius Asiaticus was her first husband, and after his death in 69 AD she was helped by Vespasian to make a good marriage to an unnamed man. Historian Settipani has proposed that her second son-in-law was Libo Rupilius Frugi and that his daughter Rupilia Faustina was also Vitellia's daughter, thus explaining the use of the nomen Galeria among female members of the Nerva–Antonine dynasty.
