= Vitellius =

Roman emperor in AD 69

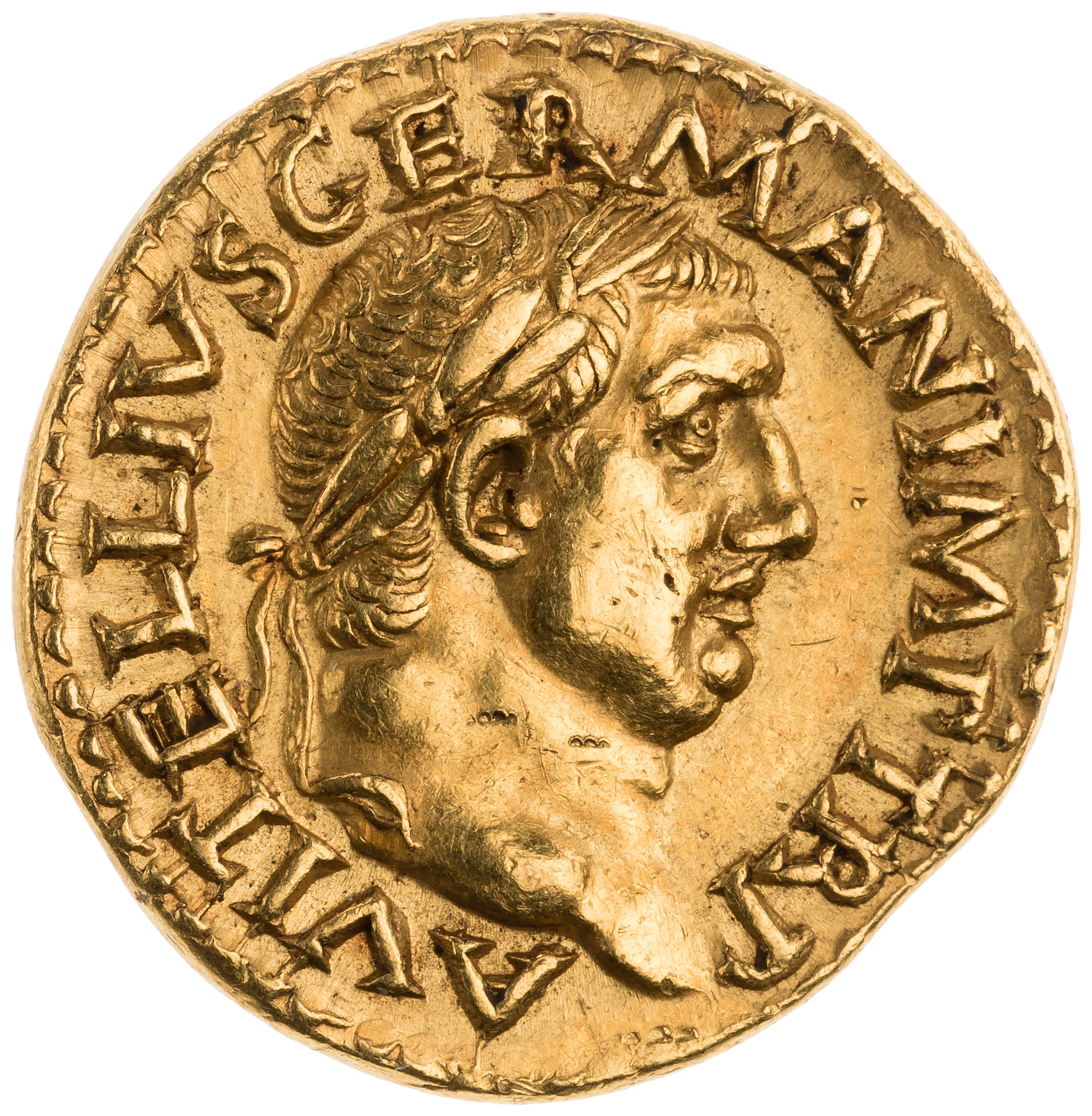
- Aureus of Vitellius

Roman emperor
- Reign: 19 April – 20 December 69
- Predecessor: Otho
- Successor: Vespasian
- Born: 24 September 15; Nuceria Alfaterna, Italy, Roman Empire
- Died: 20 December 69 (aged 54); Rome, Italy, Roman Empire
- Spouses: Petronia; Galeria Fundana
- Issue Detail: Aulus Vitellius Petronianus; Aulus Vitellius Germanicus; Vitellia
Names
- Aulus Vitellius
Regnal name
- Aulus Vitellius Germanicus Imperator Augustus
- Father: Lucius Vitellius
- Mother: Sextilia

Aulus Vitellius (/vɪˈtɛliəs/; Latin: [wɪˈtɛlːiʊs]; 24 September 15 – 20 December 69) was Roman emperor, ruling for eight months from 19 April to 20 December AD 69. Vitellius became emperor following the quick succession of the previous emperors Galba and Otho, in a year of civil war known as the Year of the Four Emperors. Vitellius added the honorific title Germanicus to his name instead of Caesar upon his accession. Like his predecessor, Otho, Vitellius attempted to rally public support to his cause by honoring and imitating Nero who remained popular in the empire.

Originally from Campania, likely from Nuceria Alfaterna, he was born to the Vitellia gens, a relatively obscure family in ancient Rome. He was a noble companion of Tiberius's retirement on Capri and there befriended Caligula. He was elected consul in 48, and served as proconsular governor of Africa in either 60 or 61. In 68, he was chosen to command the army of Germania Inferior by emperor Galba. He was later proclaimed emperor in January by the armies of Germania Inferior and Superior, beginning a revolt against Galba. Galba was assassinated by Otho, and Vitellius then faced Otho in battle. He defeated Otho at the Battle of Bedriacum, and was recognized emperor by the Roman Senate.

His claim to the throne was soon challenged by legions stationed in the eastern provinces, who proclaimed their commander Vespasian emperor instead. War ensued, leading to a crushing defeat for Vitellius at the Second Battle of Bedriacum in northern Italy. Once he realised his support was wavering, Vitellius prepared to abdicate in favor of Vespasian. He was not allowed to do so by his supporters, resulting in a brutal battle for Rome between Vitellius's forces and the armies of Vespasian. He was executed in Rome by Vespasian's soldiers on 20 December 69.

== Early life ==
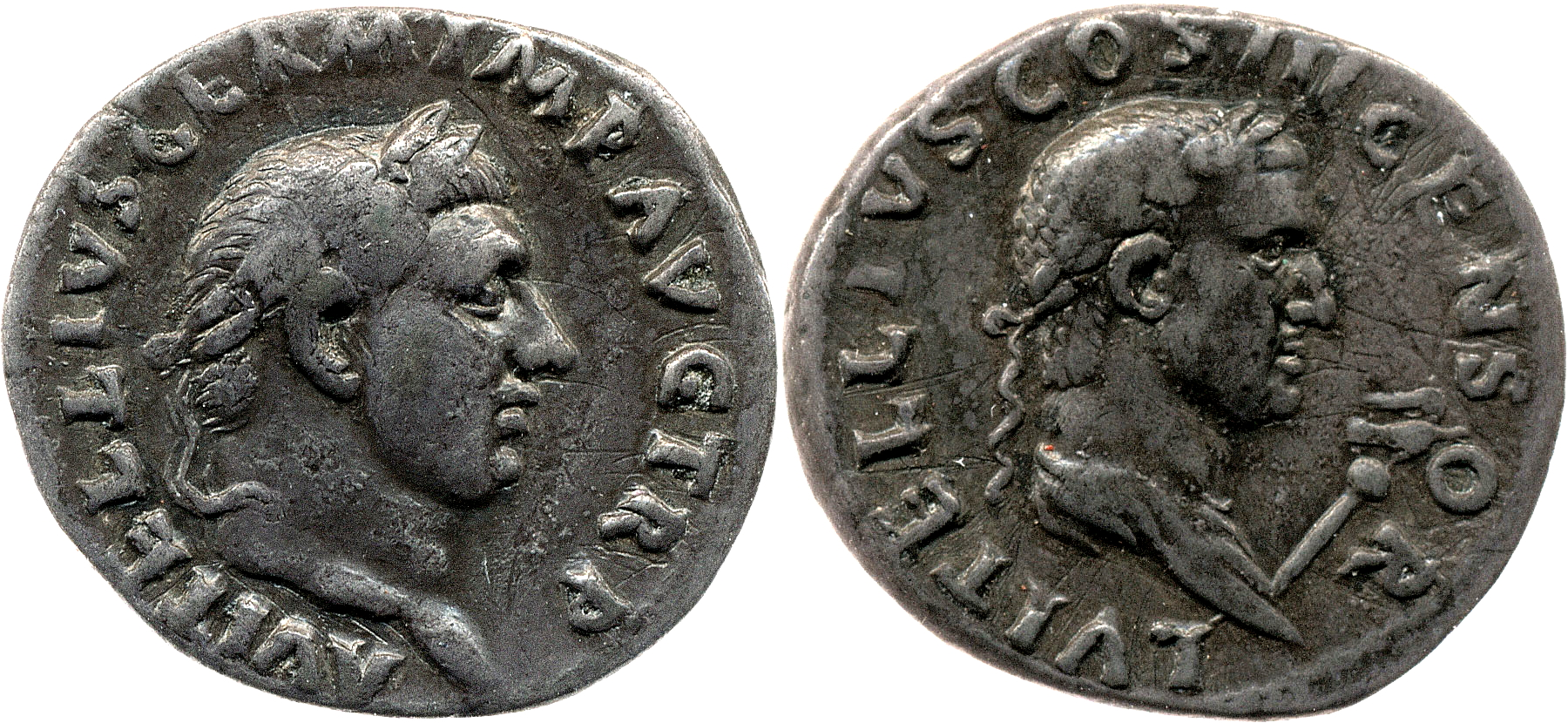

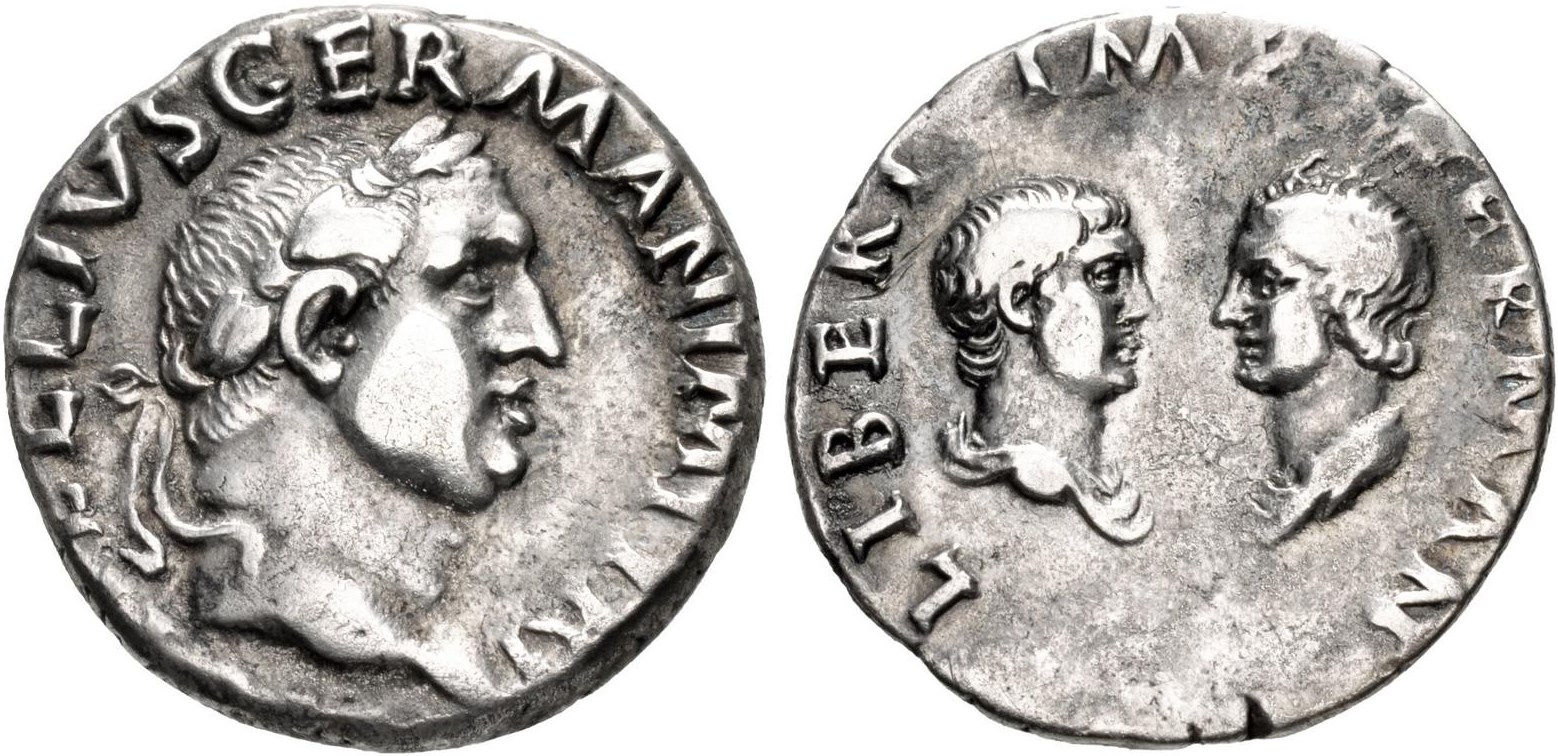
Denarii of Vitellius, with a portrait of his father Lucius Vitellius (top) and his son and daughter (bottom)

Aulus Vitellius was born on 24 September 15, in Nuceria Alfaterna, Campania. He was the son of Lucius Vitellius and his wife Sextilia, and had one brother, who was also named Lucius Vitellius. Suetonius recorded two different accounts of the origins of the gens Vitellia, one making them descendants of past rulers of Latium, the other describing their origins as lowly.

Suetonius makes the sensible remark that both accounts might have been made by either flatterers or enemies of Vitellius—except that both were in circulation before Vitellius became emperor. Since his father was a member of the equestrian class and achieved the senatorial rank only later in his lifetime, Vitellius became the first emperor not to be born in the senatorial family. Suetonius also recorded that when Vitellius was born his horoscope so horrified his parents that his father tried to prevent Aulus from becoming a consul.

In his youth, he was one of the noble companions of Tiberius's retirement on Capri. Shortly thereafter, Vitellius was able to befriend the young Caligula, due to their common passion for chariots and games of dice.

== Public service ==
=== Political and military career ===
He was consul in 48, and proconsular governor of Africa in either 60 or 61, in which capacity he is said to have acquitted himself with credit. At the end of 68, Galba, to the general astonishment, selected him to command the army of Germania Inferior, and here Vitellius made himself popular with his subalterns and with the soldiers by outrageous prodigality and excessive good nature, which soon proved fatal to order and discipline.

=== Bid for power ===
He owed his elevation to the throne to Caecina and Fabius Valens, commanders of two legions on the Rhine. Through these two men a military revolution was speedily accomplished; they refused to renew their vows of allegiance to Emperor Galba on 1 January 69. Vitellius was proclaimed emperor at Cologne on the following day, and then again on the day after. More accurately, he was proclaimed emperor of the armies of Germania Inferior and Superior. The armies of Gaul, Britannia and Raetia sided with them shortly afterwards. By the time that they marched on Rome, however, it was Otho, and not Galba, whom they had to confront.

In fact, he was never acknowledged as emperor by the entire Roman world, though at Rome the Senate accepted him and decreed to him the imperial honours on 19 April. He advanced into Italy at the head of a licentious and rough soldiery, and Rome became the scene of riot and massacre, gladiatorial shows and extravagant feasting. To reward his victorious legionaries, Vitellius expanded the existing Praetorian Guard and installed his own men from his Rhine army.

== Emperor ==
=== Administration ===
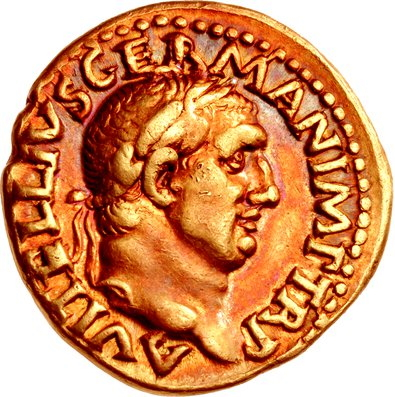

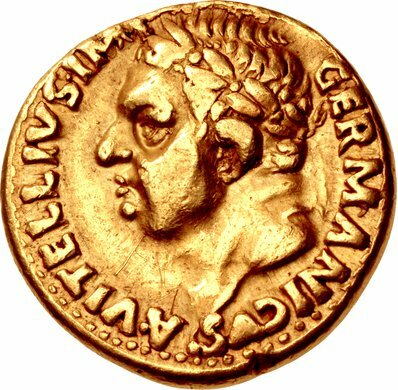
Two aurei of Vitellius

Suetonius, whose father had fought for Otho at Bedriacum, gives an unfavourable account of Vitellius's brief administration: he describes him as unambitious and notes that Vitellius showed indications of a desire to govern wisely, but that Valens and Caecina encouraged him in a course of vicious excesses which threw his better qualities into the background. He is even reported to have starved his own mother to death—to fulfill a prophecy by a Chattian seeress that he would rule longer if his mother died first; alternatively there is a report that his mother asked for poison to commit suicide—a request he granted. Suetonius additionally remarks that Vitellius's besetting sins were luxury and cruelty. Other writers, namely Tacitus and Cassius Dio, disagree with some of Suetonius's assertions, even though their own accounts are scarcely positive ones.

Despite his short reign he made two important government contributions which outlasted him. Tacitus describes them both in his Histories:

- Vitellius ended the practice of centurions selling furloughs and exemptions of duty to their men, a change Tacitus describes as being adopted by 'all good emperors'.
- He also expanded the offices of the Imperial administration beyond the imperial pool of freedmen, allowing those of the Equites to take up positions in the Imperial civil service.

Vitellius also banned astrologers from Rome and Italy on 1 October 69. Some astrologers responded to his decree by anonymously publishing a decree of their own: "Decreed by all astrologers in blessing on our State Vitellius will be no more on the appointed date." In response, Vitellius executed any astrologers he came across.

Furthermore, Vitellius continued Otho's policies in regard to Nero's memory, in that he honored the dead emperor and sacrificed to his spirit. He also had Nero's songs performed in public, and attempted to imitate Nero, who remained extremely popular among the lower classes of the Roman Empire.

=== Reputation ===
Suetonius is particularly responsible for giving Vitellius the reputation of being an obese glutton, using emetics so as to be able to indulge in banquets four times a day, and often having himself invited over to a different noble's house for each one. One of the most famous of these feasts was offered Vitellius by his brother Lucius,

at which, it is said, there were served up no less than two thousand choice fishes, and seven thousand birds. Yet even this supper he himself outdid, at a feast which he gave upon the first use of a dish which had been made for him, and which, for its extraordinary size, he called "The Shield of Minerva". In this dish there were tossed up together the livers of pike, the brains of pheasants and peacocks, with the tongues of flamingos, and the entrails of lampreys, which had been brought in ships of war as far as from Parthia and the Spanish Straits.

A noted gourmet of that time, Marcus Gavius Apicius, named after the emperor a less exotic dish of peas or broad beans mashed with sweet and sour ingredients. Edward Gibbon, in The History of the Decline and Fall of the Roman Empire, refers to "the beastly Vitellius" among "the unworthy successors of Augustus", adding in a footnote:

Vitellius consumed in mere eating at least six millions of our money, in about seven months. It is not easy to express his vices with dignity, or even decency. Tacitus fairly calls him a hog; but it is by substituting for a coarse word a very fine image.

=== Challenges ===
In July 69, Vitellius learned that the armies of the eastern provinces had proclaimed a rival emperor: their commander, Titus Flavius Vespasianus. As soon as it was known that the armies of the East, Dalmatia, and Illyricum had declared for Vespasianus, Vitellius sent several legions under Caecina to prevent the Eastern armies from entering Italy, but Caecina, dissatisfied with Vitellius's poor administration, attempted without success to defect to Vespasian. This undermined the morale of the Vitellian legions, and they were decisively defeated at the Second Battle of Bedriacum. Fabius Valens was then sent by Vitellius to rally supporting armies in Gaul, but forces loyal to Vespasian captured and executed him soon after. Vitellius, now deserted by many of his adherents, prepared to abdicate the title of emperor.

=== Abdication and death ===
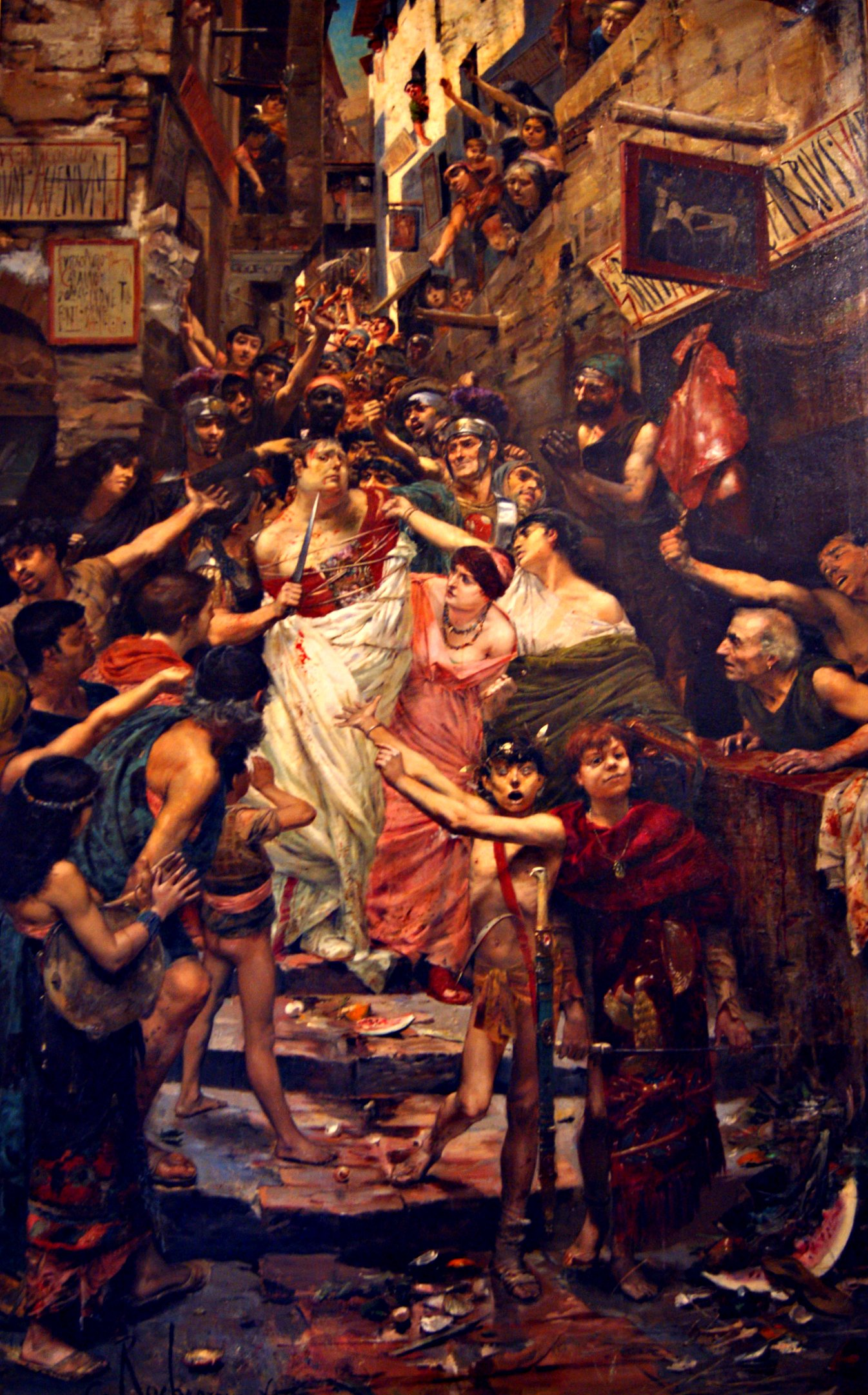
Vitellius dragged through the streets of Rome, Georges Rochegrosse (1883)

Tacitus's Histories state that Vitellius awaited Vespasian's army at Mevania. The terms of abdication had actually been agreed upon with Marcus Antonius Primus, the commander of the sixth legion serving in Pannonia and one of Vespasian's chief supporters. However, as he was on his way to deposit the insignia of empire in the Temple of Concord, the Praetorian Guard refused to allow him to carry out the agreement, and forced him to return to the palace.

On the entrance of Vespasian's troops into Rome, Vitellius's supporters (mostly civilians) organized heavy resistance, resulting in a brutal battle. Entrenched on the city's buildings, they threw stones, javelins, and tiles on Vespasian's soldiers who consequently suffered heavy casualties in the urban fighting. Cassius Dio claims that 50,000 people died in the battle for Rome. Large parts of the city were destroyed, including the Temple of Jupiter Optimus Maximus. Vitellius was eventually dragged out of a hiding-place (according to Tacitus a door-keeper's lodge), driven to the fatal Gemonian stairs, and there struck down by Vespasian's supporters. "Yet I was once your emperor," were his last words. His body was thrown into the Tiber according to Suetonius; Cassius Dio's account is that Vitellius was beheaded and his head paraded around Rome, and his wife attended to his burial. His brother and son were also killed.

Suetonius, in writing of Vitellius's execution, offers his physical description: "... He was in fact abnormally tall, with a face usually flushed from hard drinking, a huge belly, and one thigh crippled from being struck once by a four-horse chariot, when he was in attendance on Gaius as he was driving ...".

According to Suetonius more than fifty years later, several years before Vitellius's death there was a prediction that he would fall into the power of a man from Gaul. Marcus Antonius Primus was from Toulouse in Gaul, and his nickname was Becco which means "rooster's beak": Gallus means both "a cock" and "a Gaul".

== Personal life ==
He married firstly a woman named Petronia, who was the daughter of an ex-consul. They had a son, Aulus Vitellius Petronianus, who was blind in one eye. He was the universal heir of his mother and grandfather, but Vitellius had him killed in order to inherit his fortune. He married secondly, around the year 50, a woman named Galeria Fundana, perhaps the granddaughter of Gaius Galerius, Prefect of Egypt in 23. They had two children, a son, who was named as heir and was given the title Germanicus, and a daughter, Vitellia, who married Decimus Valerius Asiaticus.

== Portrayals ==
=== In coinage ===
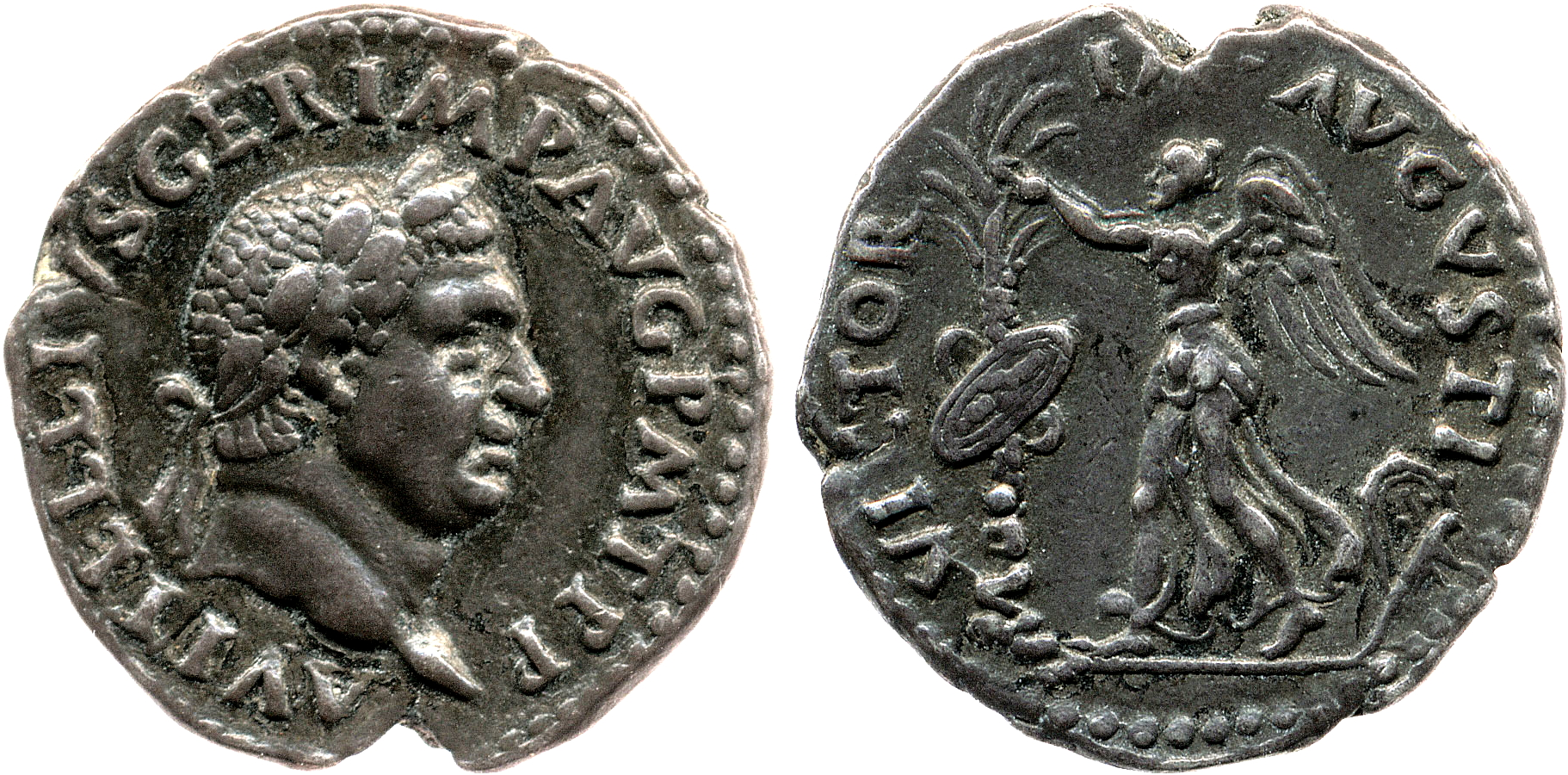
Denarius of Vitellius, with the goddess Victory erecting a trophy on the reverse, alluding to the incoming confrontation with Vespasian

As Vitellius was not recognised emperor by the Senate until 19 April 69—soon after Otho's suicide—he had to rely on other mints for his coin supply until his arrival at Rome. He first used the Spanish mint of Tarraco (now Tarragona) from January 69, then the mint of Lugdunum (now Lyon, France) a bit later. Taracco produced much more coins than Lugdunum, which might have not even struck bronze coinage. These two mints closed at the beginning of summer 69, by which time the mint of Rome had taken over.

Every coin of Vitellius features the title "Germanicus", referring to the legions of the Rhine that supported his bid for power. Regardless of the mint, this title was progressively shortened to "Germ" on the coins. Numismatist C. H. V. Sutherland notes that the prevalence of the title indicates that Vitellius used it almost like a cognomen. The coins Vitellius minted before his official proclamation as Emperor on 19 April do not bear the title "Augustus", while the title "Pontifex Maximus" appears on coins minted after his election at this title on 18 July.

The last type of coin minted by Vitellius were aurei and denarii with the goddess Victory building a trophy, likely alluding to his hopeful victory against the incoming armies of Vespasian.

=== In art ===
Busts from the time of Vitellius, particularly the one in the Capitoline Museums, represent him as broad-faced with several double chins, and it is this type which informs paintings of the emperor from the Renaissance on. There were once other ancient busts claimed to be of Vitellius which later scholarship has proved to be of someone else. The features of the Grimani Vitellius particularly, according to Mary Beard, were once used by painters to suggest that the character who bears them is destined to come to a bleak end. Another such bust figures in Michiel Sweerts's Baroque genre piece of a young art student drawing a copy.

The Grimani portrait bust also served as the model for one by Giovanni Battista and Nicola Bonanome (c. 1565), one of a series of The Twelve Caesars that were once fashionable in large households. The series was also a popular subject for paintings, of which there have been examples by Titian, Peter Paul Rubens, Otto van Veen, and many others.

Several 19th-century French artists pictured the violent end of Vitellius. That by Georges Rochegrosse (1883) depicts him being dragged by the populace down the steep Gemonian stairs, stretching from high on the canvas to its foot [see above]. There he appears bound and surrounded by a gesticulating mob with hooting ragamuffins at their head. The stairs are covered with the rubbish with which the deposed emperor has been pelted and, as Suetonius describes the scene, a long blade is held at his throat so that he cannot look down. Others paintings show the moment of his execution, of which there are examples by Charles-Gustave Housez, Paul-Jacques-Aimé Baudry (1847), Jules-Eugène Lenepveu (1847), and an engraving by Edouard Vimont (1876–1930).

Much as the appearance of Vitellius prefigured approaching doom in earlier centuries, Thomas Couture pictures him in shadow to the left of centre in the painting The Romans in their Decadence (1847). This was shown prophetically at the Paris Salon in the year before the French Revolution of 1848 toppled the July Monarchy.

=== In literature ===
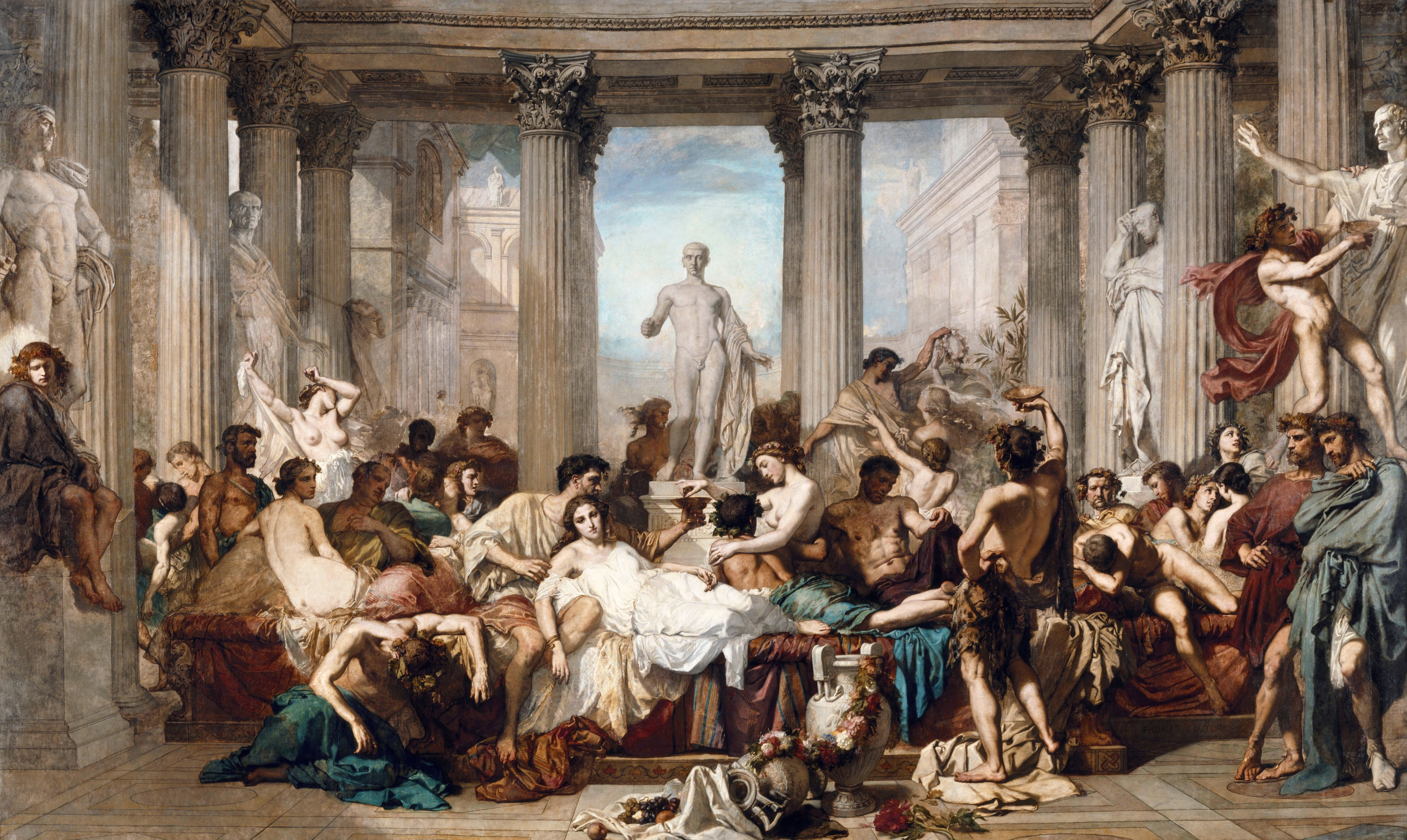
The Romans in their Decadence by Thomas Couture

The earliest fictional appearance of a Vitellius was of the Roman Consul in Syria, Lucius Vitellius (the father of Aulus), who intervened in Judaean affairs in the time of Pontius Pilate. It is he who figures in Gustave Flaubert's novella Hérodias (1877) and in Hérodiade, the 1881 opera based on it by Jules Massenet. The same character also makes an appearance in the 1930 novel by Iwan Naschiwin (1874–1940), A Certain Jesus: the Gospel According to Thomas: an Historical Novel of the First Century.

The son of Lucius, Aulus Vitellius, played a minor part in Henryk Sienkiewicz's novel Quo Vadis, set at the end of Nero's reign. Although he survived as a character in the 1900 Broadway production, and in the Italian films based on it of 1913 and 1924, he disappeared from later adaptations. But some later novels deal with incidents in the military career of this Vitellius. In Simon Scarrow's Eagles of the Empire series, he is introduced as a rival to Vespasian during the Roman invasion of Britain. And in later chapters of Henry Venmore-Rowland's novel The Last Caesar (2012) he figures as the newly appointed Governor of Lower Germania and something of a glutton.

Naturally Vitellius is a character in the rash of recent novels dealing with the Year of the Four Emperors. He is in the background in Kate Quinn's novel Daughters of Rome (2011), and shares a section of Steven Saylor's Empire: The Novel of Imperial Rome (2010). His fall features in Manda Scott's Rome, The Art of War (2013), and he also appears in James Mace's two-part series, The Year of the Four Emperors.

=== Bust portraits ===
Several busts have been thought to depict Vitellius, but these identifications are usually based on vague resemblances with coin portraits. In reality it's almost impossible to identify most busts with any particular emperor, specially with one as short-lived as Vitellius.

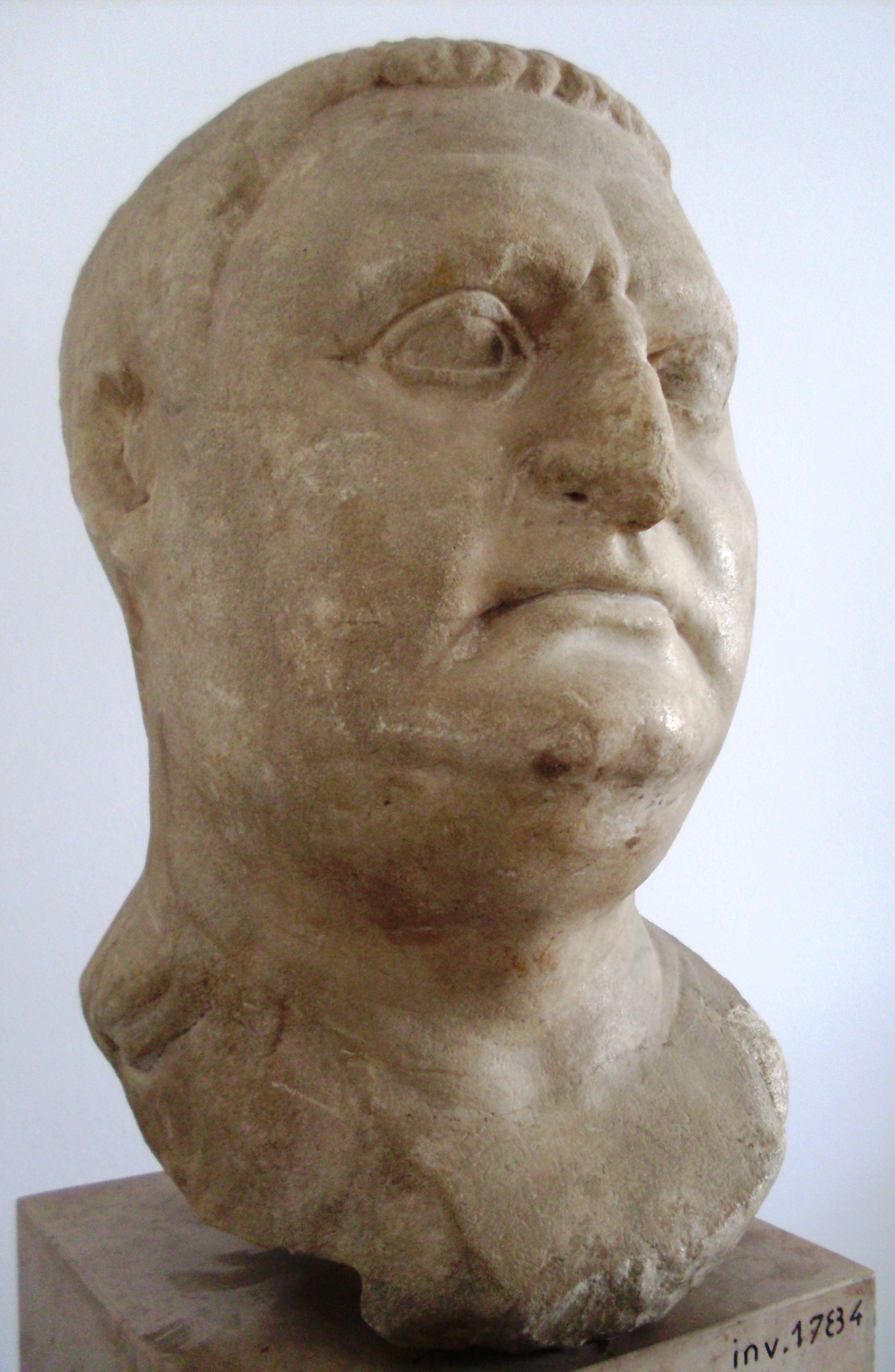
Head labelled as Vitellius in the Bardo National Museum, Tunisia. The identification has been generally accepted.

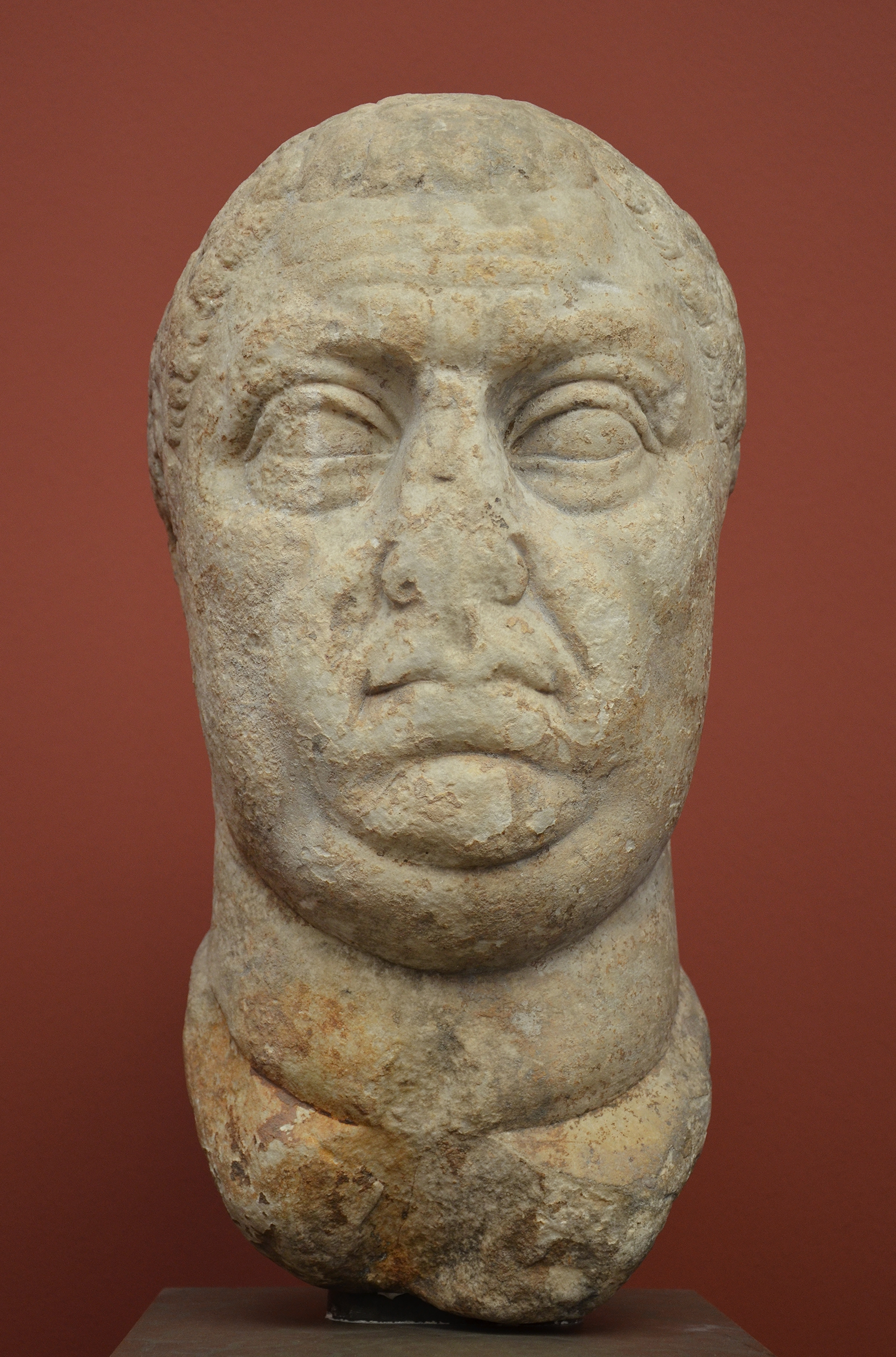
Damaged head of Vitellius in the Ny Carlsberg Glyptotek, Denmark. The damage is the result of damnatio memoriae.

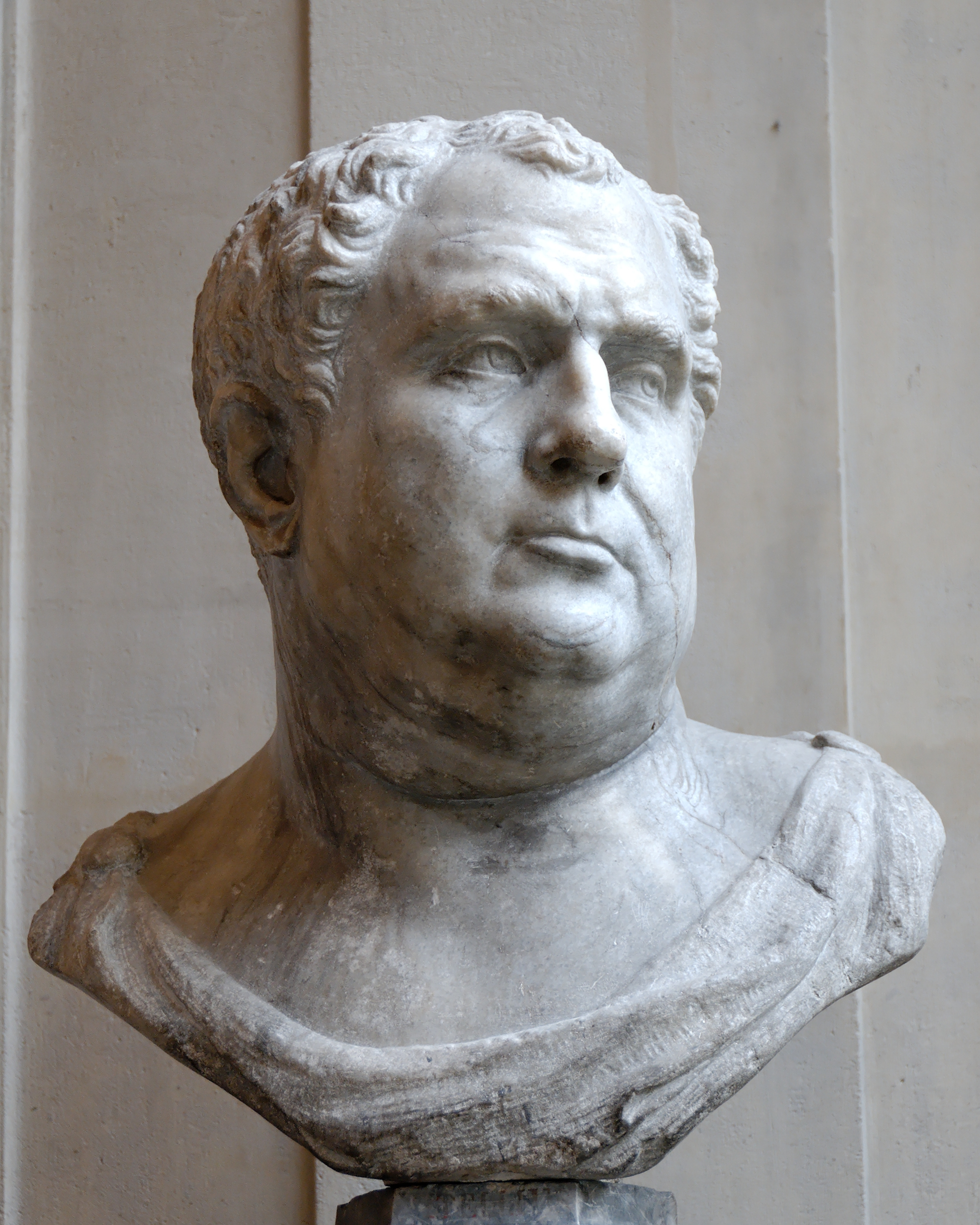
The "Pseudo-Vitellius", once thought to depict the emperor, Louvre

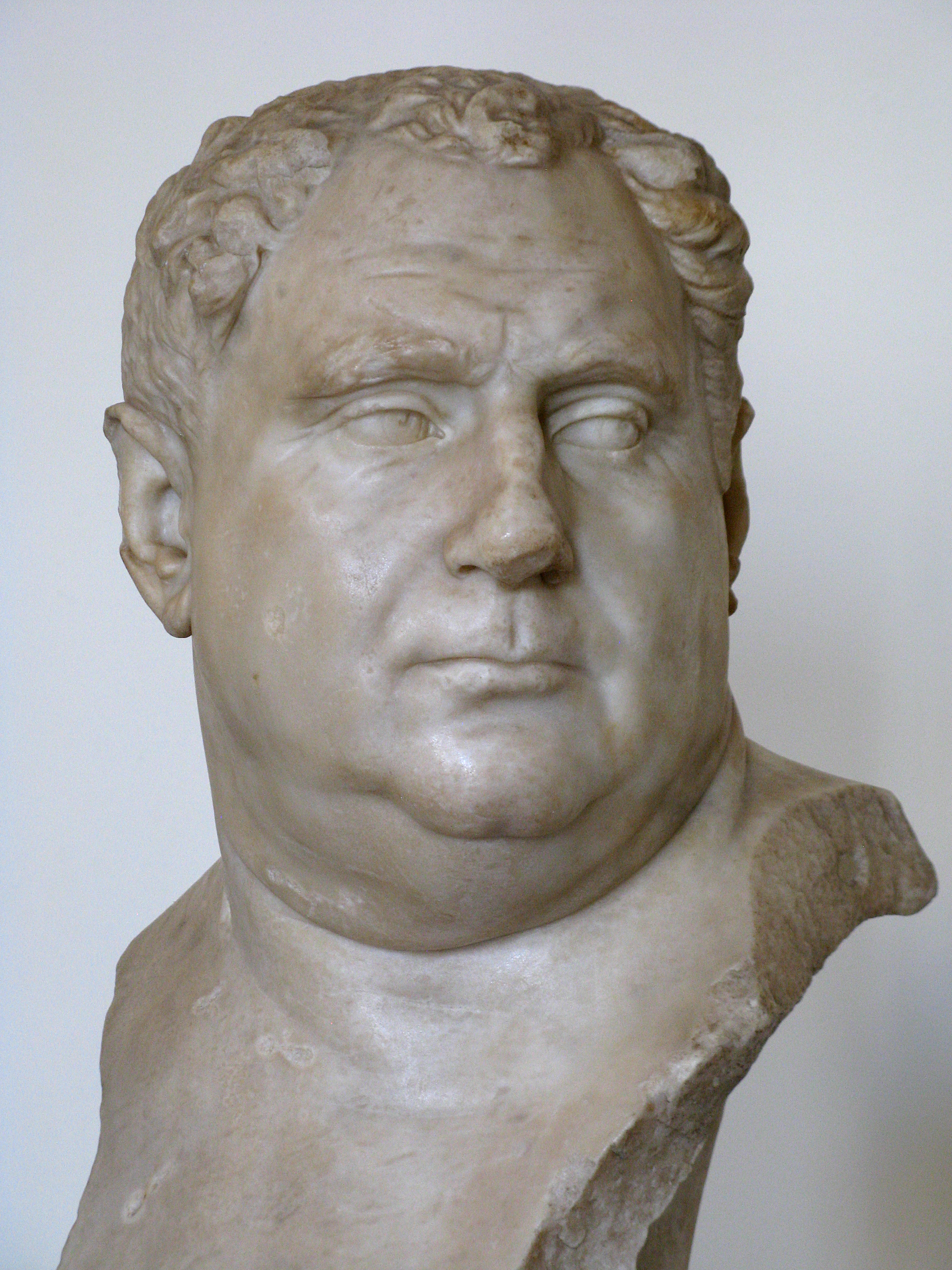
The "Vitellius of Grimani", once thought to depict the emperor, Venice National Archaeological Museum

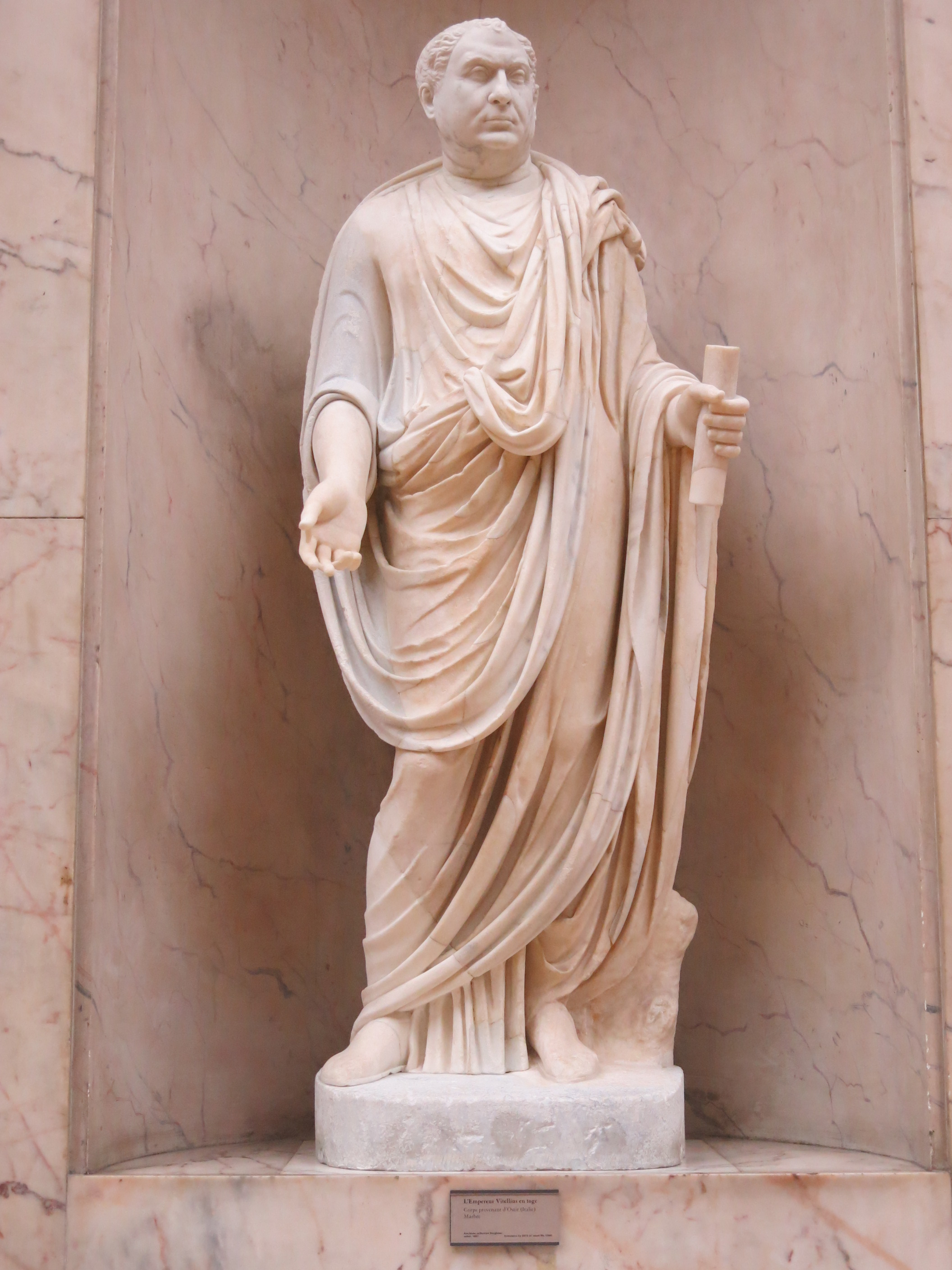
Statue in the Louvre labelled as Vitellius

== Bibliography ==
=== Primary sources ===
- Cassius Dio, Roman History, fragments of Book 64 (English translation by Earnest Cary on LacusCurtius).
- Plutarch, Life of Galba (English translation by A.H. Clough on Wikisource).
- Suetonius, The Twelve Caesars, Vitellius (English translation by John Carew Rolfe on Wikisource).
- Tacitus, Annales (Tacitus) (English translation by Alfred John Church and William Jackson Brodribb (1876) on Wikisource).

=== Secondary sources ===
- Kelly, Benjamin (2007). "Riot Control and Imperial Ideology in the Roman Empire". Phoenix. 61 (1/2). Toronto: University of Toronto Press, Classical Association of Canada: 150–176. JSTOR 20304642.
- Varner, Eric (2017). "Nero's Memory in Flavian Rome". In Bartsch, Shadi; Freudenberg, Kirik; Littlewood, Cedric (eds.). The Cambridge Companion to the Age of Nero. Cambridge: Cambridge University Press. pp. 238–258. ISBN 978-1107669239.
- Biography at Livius
- Biography at De Imperatoribus Romanis
- Mattingly, Harold; Sydenham, Edward A.; Sutherland, C. H. V. (1984) [1923]. Roman Imperial Coinage, 31 BC to AD 69. Vol. 1. London: Spink & Son.

Political offices
Preceded by Otho	Roman emperor 69	Succeeded by Vespasian
Preceded by Gnaeus Hosidius Geta, and Gaius Volasenna Severus as Suffect consuls	Roman consul 48 with L. Vipstanus Publicola Messalla	Succeeded by Quintus Veranius Nepos, and Gaius Pompeius Longus Gallus as Suffect consuls
