= Vetus =

Vetus may refer to:

== People ==
- Camerinus Antistius Vetus, Roman senator
- Gaius Antistius Vetus, multiple people
- Lucius Antistius Vetus (consul 55), Roman senator
- Lucius Calventius Sextus Carminius Vetus, Roman senator
- Lucius Calventius Vetus Carminius, Roman senator

== Species ==
- Enoclerus vetus, species of checkered beetle
- Maiestas vetus, species of bug
- Phyllops vetus, extinct relative of the Cuban fig-eating bat
- Tentax vetus, species of moth

== Religion ==
- Vetus Latina, translations of the Bible
- Vetus Latina manuscripts, copies of the Bible
- Synodicon Vetus, book about early Christianity
- Vetus Testamentum, academic journal
- Basilica vetus, church in Italy
- Capitolium Vetus, temple in Rome

== Other uses ==
- Quadrans Vetus, medieval astronomical instrument
- Vagus Vetus, album
- Aqua Anio Vetus, Roman aqueduct
- Aboa Vetus & Ars Nova, museum in Finland
- Ars Vetus, multiple concepts
