= Gaius Calvisius Sabinus =

Gaius Calvisius Sabinus may refer to:

- Gaius Calvisius Sabinus (consul 39 BC), a consul of the Roman Republic under the Second Triumvirate.
- Gaius Calvisius Sabinus (consul 4 BC), a Roman Senator and consul under the reign of Augustus.
- Gaius Calvisius Sabinus (consul AD 26), a Roman consul during the reign of emperor Tiberius.

See also: Calvisii Sabini.
