= Gaius Antistius Vetus =

Gaius Antistius Vetus can refer to the following Roman people:

- Gaius Antistius Vetus (praetor 70 BC)
- Gaius Antistius Vetus (consul 30 BC)
- Gaius Antistius Vetus, Augustus's quaestor, consul in 6 BC
- Gaius Antistius Vetus (consul 23)
- Gaius Antistius Vetus (consul 50)
- Gaius Antistius Vetus (consul 96)
