= Censorinus (disambiguation) =

Censorinus was a Roman grammarian and writer of the 3rd century AD.

Censorinus may also refer to:

- Censorinus (died 53 BC), friend and contemporary of Publius Crassus
- Several ancient Romans of the gens Marcia; see Marcius Censorinus
- Censorinus (usurper), a fictional usurper against Roman Emperor Claudius II (c. 269 AD)
- Censorinus (crater), on the Moon
