= Lucius Vinicius =

Lucius Vinicius may refer to:

- Lucius Vinicius (consul 33 BC), Roman senator
- Lucius Vinicius (consul 5 BC), Roman senator
