= Eclogue 1 =

Poem by Virgil

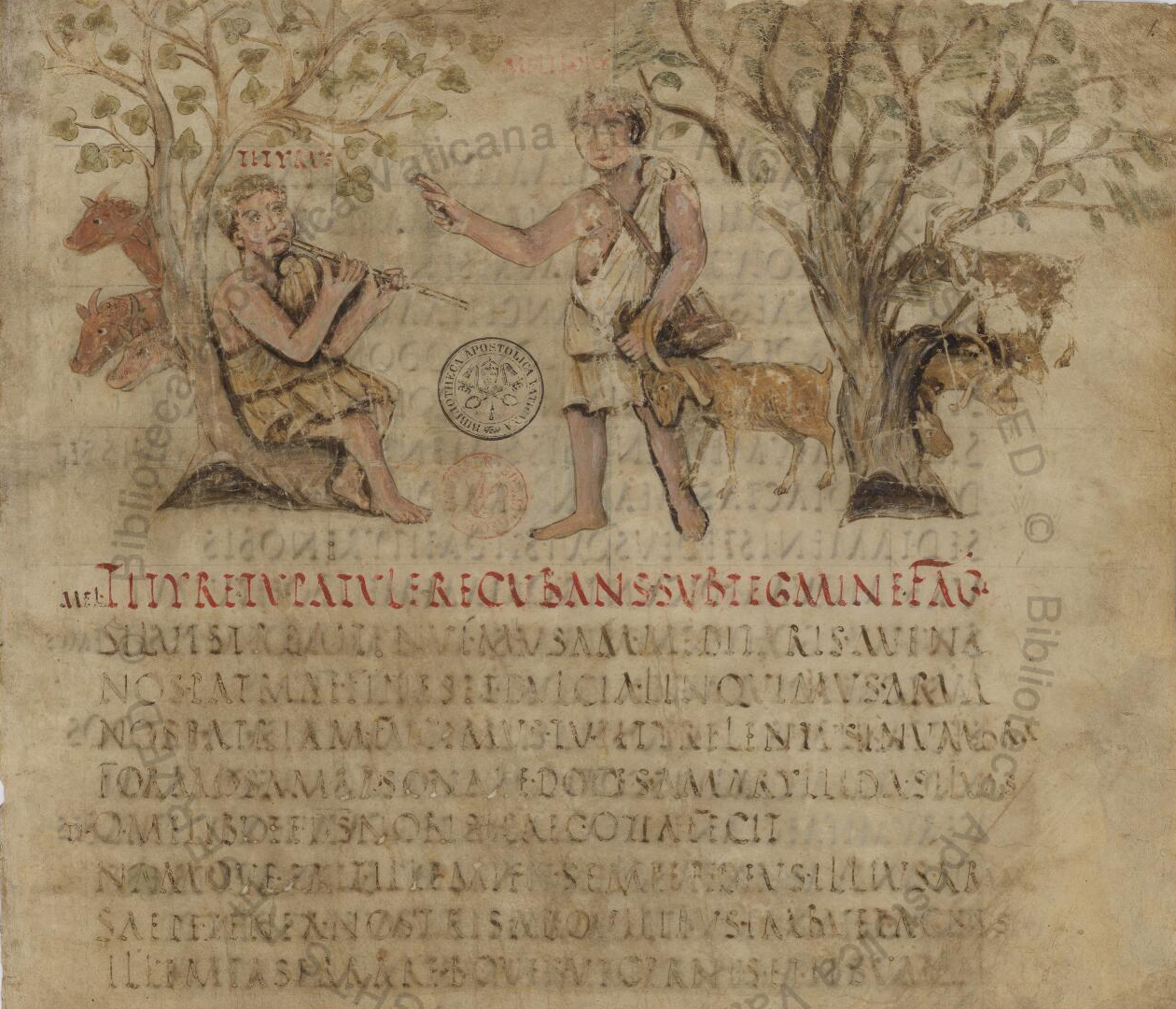
Vergilius Romanus, fol. 1 r.

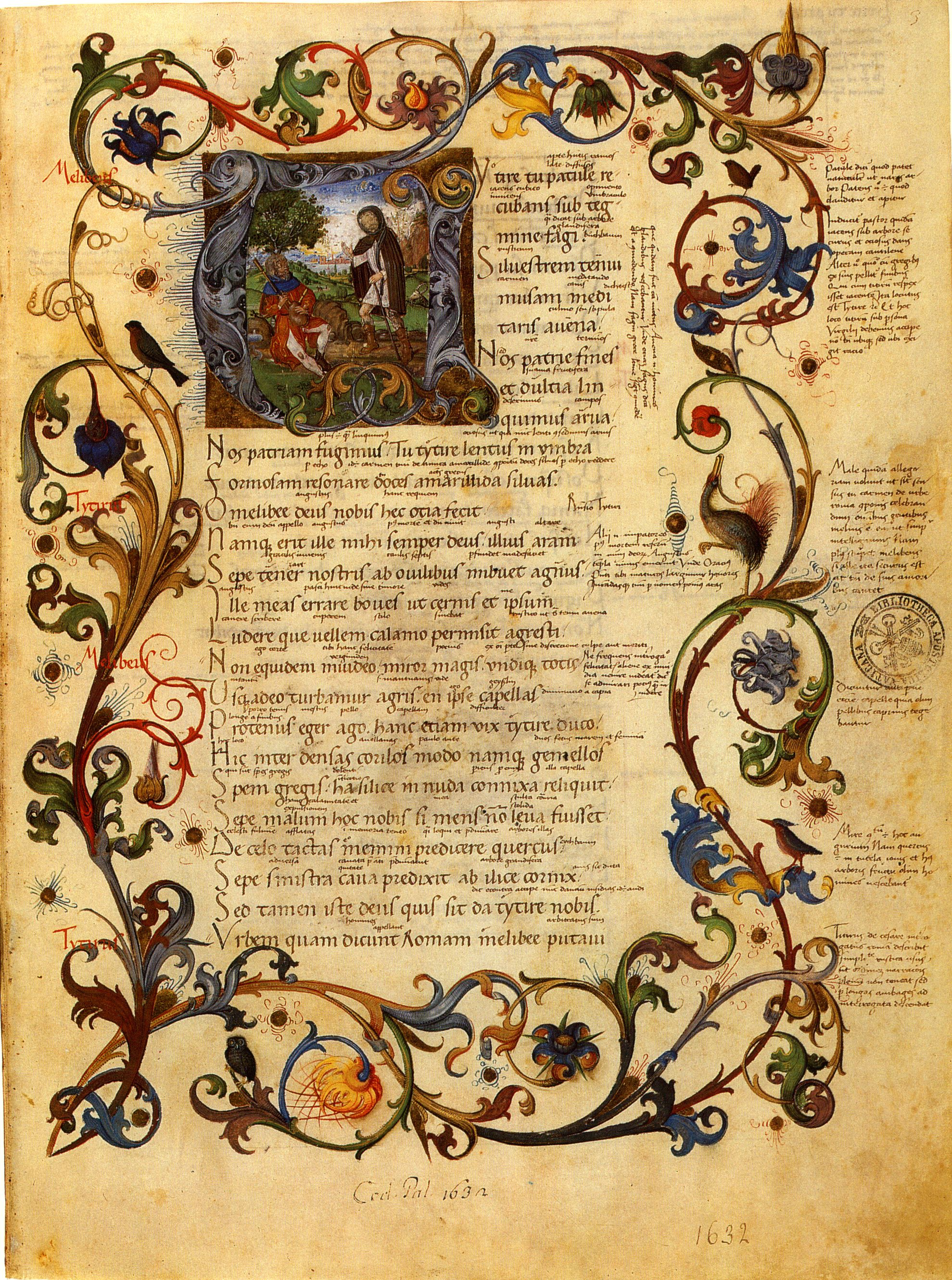
The beginning of Virgil’s Eclogues in MS. Biblioteca Apostolica Vaticana, Vaticanus Palatinus lat. 1632, fol. 3r.

Eclogue 1 (Ecloga I) is a bucolic poem by the Latin poet Virgil from his Eclogues. In this poem, which is in the form of a dialogue, Virgil contrasts the diverse fortunes of two farmers, Tityrus, an old man whose lands and liberty have been restored to him thanks to the intervention of an unnamed young man (usually identified with Octavian), and Meliboeus, who has been forced off his land, which is due to be given to a soldier (line 70). It is generally assumed that the poem refers to the confiscations of land that took place around Virgil's home town of Mantua in 41 BC in order to settle retired soldiers after the civil war. The poem has 83 lines, and is written in the dactylic hexameter metre.

== Summary ==
- 1 A herdsman, Meliboeus, comes across another herdsman, Tityrus, lying at his ease under a beech tree, singing about his beloved Amaryllis; he contrasts Tityrus's situation with his own, since he is being forced out of his native land. Tityrus replies that it is a god, to whom he will always be grateful, who has given him the leisure to do this.

- 11 Meliboeus is surprised, since all the farms are in turmoil. He himself is being forced to drive away his goats, one of which has just abandoned a pair of stillborn kids on a rock. He ought to have seen the signs when some oak trees were struck by lightning. Tityrus in reply speaks of the city of Rome, which he discovered was far larger than he had ever imagined.

- 26 Meliboeus asks why he went to Rome. Tityrus says that the cause was freedom, which he never expected, especially now that his beard is white. Now that Amaryllis has him, Galatea has left him. As long as Galatea held his passions, he had no liberty or care for his property, but all his wealth was spent in town.

- 40 Meliboeus says he had indeed wondered why Amaryllis was sad; it was because Tityrus was absent. Tityrus said he could not do otherwise: he could not escape from slavery, or find such powerful gods elsewhere. There he had seen a young man for whom he will be forever grateful, and who had answered: "Continue feeding your cows, boys, and rearing your bulls."

- 46 Meliboeus envies the fortunate old man, since he will be able to remain on his familiar land, even if it isn't very fertile. He describes the melodious humming of the bees in the willows, the song of the farmer pruning his vines, and the cooing of the pigeons and turtle-doves in the elm-tree. Tityrus replies that deer will feed in the air, fish swim on dry ground, and Parthians drink from the Arar (Saône) and Germans from the Tigris before he forgets that young man's face.

- 64 In reply Meliboeus describes how he, Meliboeus, and other displaced farmers will have to travel to Africa, Scythia, and Britain. Will he ever see his farm again? An impious soldier, a barbarian, now holds his land; this is the result that civil war brings to citizens! There is no point now in his planting pears and vines. He orders his goats to continue their journey; he will no longer be able to watch them grazing, and no longer sing songs. Tityrus suggests that Meliboeus can at least spend the night with him: he has sweet apples, soft chestnuts, and plenty of cheese. He points out the smoke now rising from the rooftops of the farmhouses and the shadows falling from the tall mountains.

== Context ==
After the defeat of Brutus and Cassius at Philippi (42 BC) the Triumvirs promised to assign to their veterans the lands of eighteen Italian cities. According to Wilkinson (1966), in 40 BC, after the Perusine War, the task of dividing up lands on the plain of northern Italy was handed over to Alfenus Varus, while Cornelius Gallus had the task of taxing the towns which were not affected. Cremona was one of the towns whose land was to be confiscated, but according to an ancient commentator (Servius Auctus) the land proved insufficient, and the surveyors continued for 15 miles into the territory of Mantua, situated some 40 miles west of Cremona. The same commentator quotes a line from a speech made by Gallus attacking Varus, saying "Though you were ordered to leave an area of 3 miles from the city wall in each direction, you scarcely left 800 paces of the water which surrounds it."

It appears from Eclogue 9 that Virgil made an appeal to Varus to spare Mantua ("alas, too close to wretched Cremona!" line 28). Wilkinson conjectures that thanks to Gallus's intervention before Octavian, the three-mile strip around Mantua was reprieved. Thus Virgil wrote Eclogue 6 in honour of Varus, but a greater honour is given to Gallus in lines 64–73, describing how Gallus was taken into the Aonian mountains and presented with Hesiod's panpipes by the musician Linus. Tityrus, in Wilkinson's view, represents those farmers within the three-mile strip who were spared. It is quite possible that Virgil himself was affected, since it is thought that his home village of Andes was located at Pietole, 3 miles south east of Mantua on the side of Cremona.

== Identity of the young man ==
In line 42 (the centre of the poem) Tityrus speaks of a iuvenis 'young man', whom he speaks of as a "god" to whom he will offer sacrifices every year. Ancient commentators and the majority of modern scholars have identified this young man as Octavian, who at this time was only about 22 years old. The identification is given weight by the references to Octavian as a iuvenis in Virgil's Georgics 1.500 as well as in Horace Satires 2.5.62 and Odes 1.2.41. According to Wilkinson, Octavian is the only person who would have had the authority to give orders to Varus.

Not every scholar accepts this identification of the young man with Octavian. Mayer (1983) wrote "Octavian is nowhere to be found in these poems". According to Mayer, the iuvenis does not refer to any particular person. Cairns (2008) makes a "vigorous case" for the young man being Gaius Asinius Pollio, consul in 40 BC, who is named or praised in Eclogue 3, 4, and (probably) in Eclogue 8, and who appears to have been Virgil's patron at the time of writing the Eclogues. Green (2021), on the other hand, following a proposal of Liegle (1943), suggests that the young man may have been Mark Antony's brother Lucius Antonius, consul in 41 BC, who the historian Appian says "alone received kindly, and promised aid to, the farmers who had been deprived of their lands" when they flocked to Rome.

Line 6 ("a god created this leisure for us") echoes a famous passage in Lucretius's philosophical poem De Rerum Natura, 5.8, where Lucretius speaks in similar terms of the philosopher Epicurus. Instead of naming the "god", Tityrus calls him just iuvenis, which ancient folk-etymology connected with the verb iuvare 'to help', just as the name Epicurus was associated with the Greek verb ἐπικουρεῖν 'to help'. According to an ancient tradition, Virgil was interested in Epicurean philosophy and is said to have studied under the philosopher Siro the Epicurean in Campania.

It has also been noticed that in the initial letters of lines 5–8, alongside the words "O Meliboeus, a god made this leisure for us", there is an apparent acrostic FONS ('source'). The significance of this is still disputed by commentators. J. J. Clauss (1997) thinks there is a reference to Hesiod here; Castelletti (2002) to Aratus; but Bing (2016), noting several correspondences with Lucretius 5.8ff, argues that Virgil is drawing his readers' attention to his literary source, Lucretius. Bing, however, emphasises that though the deus and iuvenis are evocative of Epicurus, Virgil is not necessarily saying that the young man is to be identified with Epicurus.

== Analysis ==
This eclogue has received a wide variety of interpretations. Many scholars, beginning in antiquity, have read the words in lines 26–27 (Meliboeus: "And what was the cause, so great, of your visiting Rome?" Tityrus: "Liberty...") as meaning that Tityrus is portrayed literally as a slave who travelled to Rome to obtain his freedom. However, this interpretation is not unproblematic. As Eckerman puts it: "If Tityrus is a slave, it is neither clear why Tityrus needs to go to Rome for manumission nor is it clear what 'Octavian' offers Tityrus when in Rome, since Octavian does not say anything relevant to slavery." Moreover, Tityrus himself appears to interpret the word "liberty" in terms of his love affairs with Galatea and Amaryllis ("As long as Galatea held me, I had no hope of liberty or care for my property", lines 31–32). One possibility is that Tityrus means that once he was free from the expensive Galatea, he was able to save up enough money to buy his freedom. Another possibility (suggested by Eckerman) is to assume that Tityrus is referring to the "slavery of love" (servitium amoris), which was to become a common trope of elegiac love poetry in the Augustan period.

From line 45 it appears that Tityrus was one of a group of people who petitioned 'Octavian', and who received the reply that they might carry on pasturing their cattle as before. From this it appears that Tityrus, rather than being a slave, is portrayed as one of the farmers who were threatened with confiscation of their lands. Many commentators, beginning with Quintilian (8.6.46) and the ancient commentator Servius, have taken Tityrus allegorically as representing Virgil himself, who is assumed to have travelled to Rome to plead for his land to be spared confiscation.

However, many scholars are wary of equating Tityrus directly with Virgil. According to T. E. Page, "Although Tityrus represents Virgil, he is in the main an imaginary character and only speaks for the poet occasionally. So too the scenery of the Eclogue is purely imaginary, and does not in any way describe the country round Mantua." J. B. Greenough concurs, "The poet himself … is only dimly shadowed in the person of Tityrus, a herdsman, in dialogue with another, Meliboeus, who represents Virgil's less fortunate neighbors."

The names of Tityrus and Meliboeus occur again in the Eclogues, particularly Tityrus. In Eclogue 6.4, Virgil himself is addressed by the god Apollo as "Tityrus"; he goes on to narrate the song of the god Silenus. This Tityrus is linked to the Tityrus of Eclogue 1 by the phrase "I shall sing of the rustic Muse on a thin reed" (6.8), which recalls a similar phrase in Eclogue 1.2. In Eclogues 5.12 and 9.24, "Tityrus" is asked to look after someone else's goats while they sing. In 8.55–56, the idea of comparing Tityrus's singing with that of Orpheus is dismissed as an absurdity.

In 3.1, Meliboeus is mentioned briefly as the possible owner of a flock of sheep. In Eclogue 7 he appears herding sheep and goats, and he is the narrator who retells story of the contest between Corydon and Thyrsis. Eclogue 1.71 suggests that Meliboeus is portrayed as a full Roman citizen, not a slave. Unlike all the other herdsmen, he never has a love interest, male or female.

== Sources and further reading ==
- Bing, P. (2016). "Epicurus and the iuvenis at Virgil's Eclogue 1.42". The Classical Quarterly, 66(1), 172–179.
- Cairns, F. (2008). "C. Asinius Pollio and the Eclogues". The Cambridge Classical Journal, 54, 49–79.
- Eckerman, Chris (2016). "Freedom and Slavery in Vergil's Eclogue 1". Wiener Studien. 129: 257–80. doi:10.1553/wst129s257. JSTOR 24752777.
- Flintoff, T. E. S. (March 1976), Characterisation in Virgil's Eclogues: A Lecture to the Virgil Society (PDF), pp. 16–26
- Green, R. P. H. (1996). "Octavian and Vergil's Eclogues". Euphrosyne, 24, 225–236.
- Greenough, J. B., ed. (1883). Publi Vergili Maronis: Bucolica. Aeneis. Georgica. The Greater Poems of Virgil. Vol. 1. Boston, MA: Ginn, Heath, & Co. pp. 1–4. (Public domain)
- Mayer, R. (1983). "Missing persons in the Eclogues". Bulletin of the Institute of Classical Studies, (30), 17–30.
- Page, T. E., ed. (1898). P. Vergili Maronis: Bucolica et Georgica. Classical Series. London: Macmillan & Co., Ltd. pp. 93–102. (Public domain)
- Perkell, C. (1990). "On Eclogue 1.79–83". Transactions of the American Philological Association (1974-2014), Vol. 120 (1990), pp. 171–181.
- Segal, C. P. (1965). "Tamen Cantabitis, Arcades: Exile and Arcadia in Eclogues One and Nine". Arion: A Journal of Humanities and the Classics. Vol. 4, No. 2 (Summer, 1965), pp. 237–266.
- Starr, C. G. (1955). "Virgil's acceptance of Octavian". The American Journal of Philology, 76(1), 34–46.
- Wilkinson, L. P. (1966). "Virgil and the Evictions". Hermes, 94(H. 3), 320–324.
