= Gaius Cocceius Balbus =

- Born: Gaius Cocceius Balbus
- Occupations: legate, governor, consul
- Military career
- Allegiance: Roman Empire
- Rank: legatus

Gaius Cocceius Balbus (fl. 1st century BC) was a Roman politician and military commander who served as suffect consul in 39 BC.

== Biography ==
A member of the Plebeian gens Cocceia, Cocceius Balbus was a supporter of Marcus Antonius. He was probably elected as praetor in 42 BC. In 39 BC, he was appointed suffect consul to replace Lucius Marcius Censorinus. In the same year, he was already identified as a legate to Marcus Antonius.

In around 35 BC, Cocceius Balbus served as either proconsular governor of Macedonia, or as a Legatus in Greece. If he was the governor, he would have been the replacement of Gaius Asinius Pollio and would have supervised the Roman troops deployed against Parthini and Dardanii, the tribes that threatened Macedonia. During his time in Greece, he was acclaimed as Imperator by his troops. This was possibly during his campaign against the Dardanians. He eventually abandoned Marcus Antonius and threw his support behind Octavian after Antonius divorced Octavia the Younger.

Balbus and his brother, M. Cocceius Nerva, was elevated to patrician status by Actium Augustus and were both admitted to cohors primae admissionis. Nerva served Augustus in his negotiations with Marcus Antonius.

== Sources ==
- Broughton, T. Robert S., The Magistrates of the Roman Republic, Vol. II (1951)
- Syme, Ronald, The Roman Revolution (1939)

Political offices
Preceded by Lucius Marcius Censorinus	Consul of the Roman Republic; 39 BC (suffect) with Alfenus Varus	Succeeded by Appius Claudius Pulcher; Gaius Norbanus Flaccus
