= Lucius Cornelius Lentulus (consul 3 BC) =

Roman senator (c. 42 BC - c. AD 4)

Lucius Cornelius Lentulus (c. 42 BC – c. AD 4) was a Roman politician and military officer who served as consul in 3 BC.

== Biography ==
A member of the Patrician gens Cornelia, Lentulus was probably the son of Lucius Cornelius Lentulus Cruscellio and Sulpicia. An adherent of Tiberius, Lentulus was elected consul alongside Marcus Valerius Messalla Messallinus in 3 BC, serving the entire year. In around AD 4, he was appointed governor of Africa. While governor, he was confronted by uprisings of the native tribes in the south of the province and beyond the borders. During an expedition into the Libyan Desert against one of the tribes, the Nasamones, he was killed.

Lentulus married at some point, although Ronald Syme admits to be uncertain of her identity, suggesting the daughter of Publius Cornelius Scipio consul in 16 BC, or of Publius Cornelius Lentulus Marcellinus, "yet an Aemilia Lepida is not excluded." They had a daughter, Cornelia Lentula, who married Lucius Volusius Saturninus, the suffect consul of AD 3.

== Sources ==
- Syme, Ronald (1939). The Roman Revolution. ISBN 0198810016.
- Syme, Ronald (1986). The Augustan Aristocracy. ISBN 0198147317.

Political offices
| Preceded by Gaius Calvisius Sabinus; Lucius Passienus Rufus; Gaius Caelius; Galus Sulpicius | Roman consul 3 BC with M. Valerius Messalla Messallinus | Succeeded by Augustus XIII; M. Plautius Silvanus |
