= Makasi =

Makasi may refer to:

== Places ==
- Toniki (Ancient Greek: Τωνική), a Roman era market town about modern day Makasi, Somalia
- Makasi, Barawa District, Lower Shabelle, Somalia; a modern locality about the ancient Toniki

== People ==
- Makási, the Yamakasi freerunner group of parkour artists
- Moses Makasi (born 1985) British soccer player
- Saïd Makasi (born 1982) Rwandan soccer player
- Xoliswa Caroline Makasi, a South African politician

== Other uses ==
- Tentax makasi (T. makasi), a moth

== See also ==
- Masaki (disambiguation)
