= Marcus Acilius Glabrio =

Marcus Acilius Glabrio may refer to:

- Marcus Acilius Glabrio (suffect consul 33 BC), Roman politician
- Marcus Acilius Glabrio (consul 256), Roman politician
