= Laelia gens =

Ancient Roman family

The gens Laelia was a plebeian family at Rome. The first of the gens to obtain the consulship was Gaius Laelius in 190 BC.

== Branches and cognomina ==
The only family name of the Laelii was Balbus, a common cognomen, referring to one who stammers. A few of the Laelii used personal surnames, such as Sapiens ("wise"), by which the Laelius who was a friend of the younger Scipio Africanus was sometimes known.

== Members ==
This list includes abbreviated praenomina. For an explanation of this practice, see filiation.

=== Early Laelii ===
- Gaius Laelius, grandfather of Gaius Laelius, consul in 190 BC.
- Gaius Laelius C. f., the father of Gaius Laelius, consul in 190 BC.
- Gaius Laelius C. f. C. n., consul in 190 BC, was a friend of the elder Scipio Africanus, to whom he acted as legate throughout the Second Punic War. After his consulship, he helped colonize the territory of the Boii. He was appointed to several other commissions and embassies through 170.
- Gaius Laelius C. f. C. n. Sapiens, consul in BC 140, and a close friend of the younger Scipio Africanus. He initially favoured agrarian reform, but after meeting resistance abandoned the effort, and opposed the efforts of the Gracchi, leading his aristocratic contemporaries to call him Sapiens, "the wise". He was erudite and refined, but a less persuasive speaker than some of his contemporaries.
- Laelia C. f. C. n. Major, married Quintus Mucius Scaevola, the augur. Laelia was renowned for her graceful and eloquent speech, dignified and sincere, upon which Cicero remarked, and which she passed down to her daughters, as well as her son-in-law, the orator Lucius Licinius Crassus.
- Laelia C. f. C. n. Minor, married Gaius Fannius Strabo.

=== Laelii Balbi ===
- Decimus Laelius, one of Pompey's lieutenants during the Sertorian War, who was slain in battle against Lucius Hirtuleius near the town of Lauro (Note: Lauro was just north of Baetulo, modern Badalona.) in 76 BC.
- Decimus Laelius D. f., impeached Lucius Valerius Flaccus for repetundae in his administration of Asia, BC 59. During the Civil War, Laelius was a loyal commander and emissary in the Pompeian forces.
- Decimus Laelius D. f. D. n. Balbus, quaestor pro praetore in Africa in 42 BC, took his own life following the defeat of Quintus Cornificius by Titus Sextius, who had been nominated proconsul by the triumvirs.
- Decimus Laelius D. f. D. n. Balbus, one of the quindecimvirs who oversaw the ludi saeculares in 17 BC; he was consul in 6 BC.
- Decimus Laelius D. f. D. n. Balbus, a delator during the reign of Tiberius, accused Acutia, formerly the wife of Publius Vitellius, of majestas; she was condemned, but the tribune of the plebs Junius Otho prevented Balbus from receiving a reward. Shortly thereafter, Balbus was himself condemned and banished, as one of the lovers of Albucilla. He seems to have been rehabilitated, as he was consul suffectus in 46.
- Laelia D. f. D. n., a Vestal Virgin who died in AD 64, was the daughter of Balbus, the consul of 46.

=== Others ===
- Decimus Laelius, mentioned in the Gracchan period, perhaps an ancestor of the Laelii Balbi.
- Lucius Laelius, mentioned in an inscription dating from about 88 BC.
- Publius Laelius L. f, mentioned in an inscription dating from about 88 BC.
- Lucius Laelius, mentioned in an inscription from Pergamum, dating from the late Republic.
- Lucius Laelius L. f., mentioned in an inscription from Pergamum, dating from the late Republic.
- Laelia, wife of Gaius Vibius Marsus.
- Laelius Felix, a jurist in the time of Hadrian.
- Lucius Laelius Fuscus, a second-century soldier.
- Laelius Bassus, a proconsul or legate under Septimius Severus.
- Marcus Laelius Maximus Aemilianus, consul in 227 AD.

== See also ==
- List of Roman gentes

== Bibliography ==
- Polybius, Historiae (The Histories).
- Marcus Tullius Cicero, Brutus, De Oratore, Philippicae, Laelius sive de Amicitia, Tusculanae Quaestiones, De Officiis, De Finibus Bonorum et Malorum, Epistulae ad Atticum, Philippicae, De Natura Deorum, De Republica, Pro Flacco.
- Gaius Julius Caesar, Commentarii de Bello Civili (Commentaries on the Civil War).
- Titus Livius (Livy), Ab Urbe Condita (History of Rome).
- Quintus Horatius Flaccus (Horace), Satirae (Satires).
- Marcus Velleius Paterculus, Compendium of Roman History.
- Valerius Maximus, Factorum ac Dictorum Memorabilium (Memorable Facts and Sayings).
- Lucius Annaeus Seneca (Seneca the Younger), Epistulae Morales ad Lucilium (Moral Letters to Lucilius), Naturales Quaestiones (Natural Questions).
- Sextus Julius Frontinus, Strategemata (Stratagems).
- Publius Cornelius Tacitus, Annales.
- Lucius Mestrius Plutarchus (Plutarch), Regum et Imperatorium Apophthegmata (Sayings of Kings and Commanders).
- Gaius Suetonius Tranquillus, De Viris Illustribus (Lives of Famous Men).
- Appianus Alexandrinus (Appian), Hispanica (The Spanish Wars), Punica (The Punic Wars).
- Aulus Gellius, Noctes Atticae (Attic Nights).
- Lucius Cassius Dio Cocceianus (Cassius Dio), Roman History.
- Julius Obsequens, Liber de Prodigiis (The Book of Prodigies).
- Joannes Zonaras, Epitome Historiarum (Epitome of History).
- Scholia Bobiensa (Bobbio Scholiast), Cicero's Pro Flacco.
- Dictionary of Greek and Roman Biography and Mythology, William Smith, ed., Little, Brown and Company, Boston (1849).
- George Davis Chase, "The Origin of Roman Praenomina", in Harvard Studies in Classical Philology, vol. VIII (1897).
- T. Robert S. Broughton, The Magistrates of the Roman Republic, American Philological Association (1952).
- Paul A. Gallivan, "The Fasti for the Reign of Claudius", in Classical Quarterly, vol. 28, pp. 407–426 (1978).
- John C. Traupman, The New College Latin & English Dictionary, Bantam Books, New York (1995).
- D.R. Shackleton-Bailey, Cicero: Letters to Atticus, vol. 4, Cambridge University Press (2004).
