= Quintus Ancharius (praetor 56 BC) =

Quintus Ancharius was a politician in the 1st century BCE in Ancient Rome. He was tribunus plebis in 59 . He took an active part in opposing the agrarian law of Julius Caesar, and in consequence of his services to the aristocracy of Rome was made praetor in 56, during which time he was a juror in the case of Publius Sestius under Lex Plautia Papiria.

Ancharius received the province of Macedonia the following year, succeeding Lucius Piso. He stayed there one or possibly two years. Nothing more is known of his rule or his successors; the next known ruler of the province is Titus Antistius in 50 BCE.

One of Cicero's letters is written to Ancharius.
