= Siege of Aracillum =

25 BCE siege

Coordinates: 43°1′48″N 4°8′0″W

- Part of the Cantabrian Wars
- A map of the contemporary Cantabrian territory.
Date	25 BC
Location	Aracillum, Cantabria, Hispania
Result	Roman victory

Belligerents
Roman Empire	Cantabri

Commanders and leaders
Gaius Antistius Vetus; Augustus	Unknown

Strength
5 legions	15,000–25,000 warriors

The siege of Aracillum was a siege of the Cantabrian Wars that occurred in 25 BC. The battle took place between the forces of the Roman Empire, which consisted of five Roman legions commanded by Gaius Antistius Vetus and the forces of the Cantabri people, who had fortified the hill fort at Aracillum. The battle resulted in a Roman victory.

Aracillum was subjected to a fierce siege by the Romans, who would eventually take the settlement. The Roman commander, Gaius Antistius Vetus had taken charge of Caesar's legions when Augustus had fallen ill on the campaign (though Caesar did conduct a majority of the battles in this campaign himself).

The hill fort was able to withstand the Roman forces for some time, but the fort was eventually surrounded by three Roman camps. The Romans constructed more than 20 kilometers of walls, battlements and trenches (circumvallatio) to trap the defenders inside the fort and to prevent any aid or reinforcements from gaining entrance. In the face of starving to death, many of the Cantabri warriors opted instead to commit suicide rather than dying of starvation or being taken prisoner and being turned into slaves.

Traditionally identified as Aradillos (Campoo de Enmedio), there has never been any concrete discovery of the actual location of the battle.
