= Gaius Antistius Reginus =

Gaius Antistius Reginus (fl. 1st century BC) was a Roman military officer and magistrate who was active during the Late Roman Republic and the early years of the Roman Empire.

== Biography ==
A member of the gens Antistia, he served as a Legate under Julius Caesar in the latter years of the Gallic Wars from 53 BC to 51 BC. He would take part in the Battle of Alesia, and spent the following winter in the territory of the Ambivareti, a client tribe of the Aedui. In 43 BC, he would be proscribed by the Second Triumvirate, yet managed to survive by hiding in Rome's sewage system. He fled to join the ranks of Sextus Pompeius in Sicily, and was most likely the "Reginus" mentioned by Cicero that was assisting in his own failed attempt to flee by sea. Following Sextus' defeat in 36 BC, Reginus would surrender to the triumvir Marcus Antonius. He later held the position of triumvir monetalis during the reign of Augustus, with his name appearing on several coins minted in the years 19-13 BC.

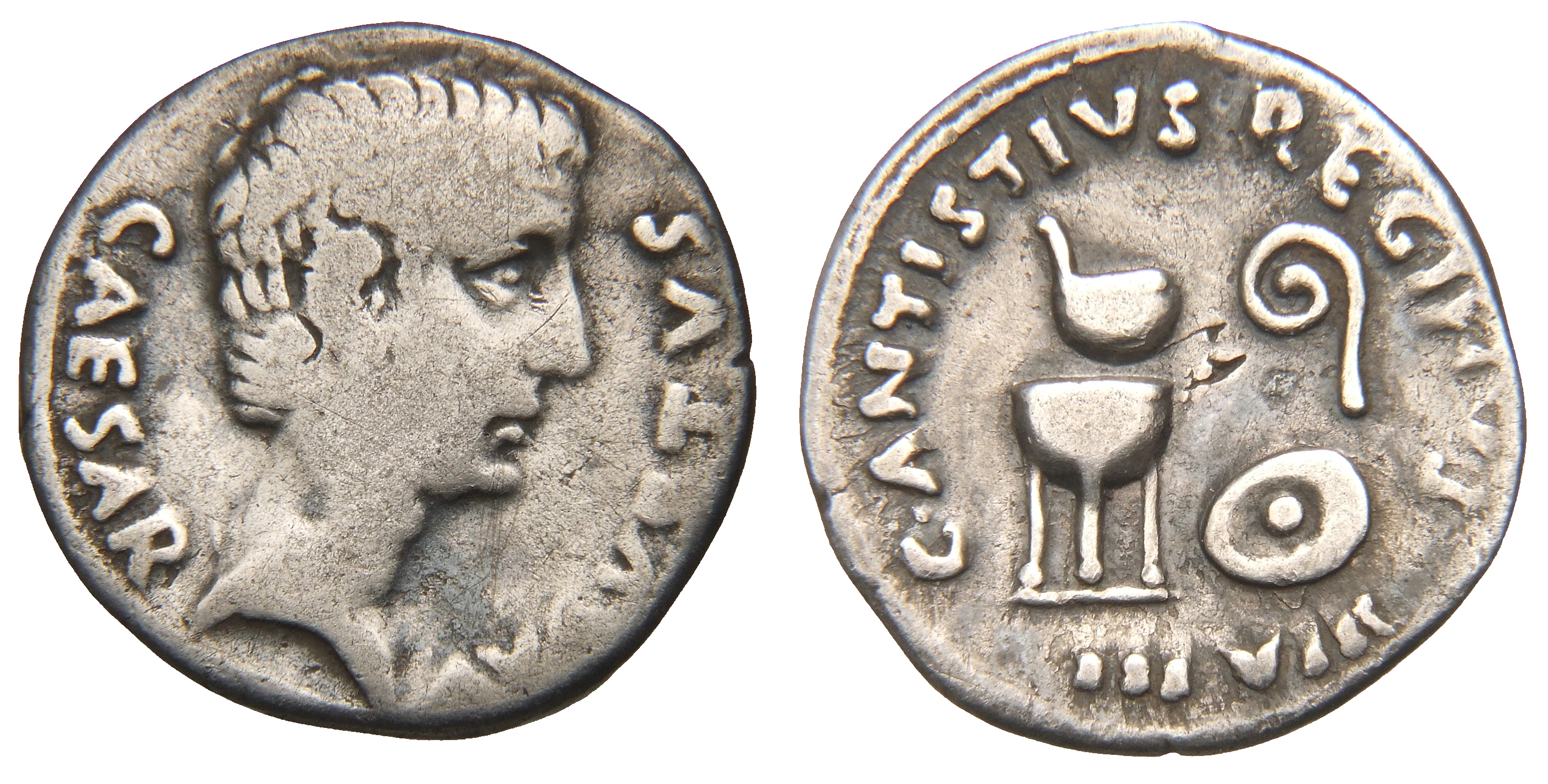
Denarius of Augustus (13 BC) featuring Gaius Antistius' name on the reverse legend.

== Bibliography ==
- Appian, Bellum Civile (The Civil War)
- Cicero, Epistulae ad Atticum (Letters to Atticus).
- Gaius Julius Caesar, Commentarii de Bello Gallico (Commentaries on the Gallic War).
- Joseph Hilarius Eckhel, Doctrina Numorum Veterum (The Study of Ancient Coins, 1792–1798).
- Megan Goldman-Petri, Acting “Republican” under Augustus: The Coin Types of the Gens Antistia, in Oxford Academic (Oct 2019)
