= Tentax badasi =

Scientific classification
- Domain: Eukaryota
- Kingdom: Animalia
- Phylum: Arthropoda
- Class: Insecta
- Order: Lepidoptera
- Superfamily: Noctuoidea
- Family: Erebidae
- Genus: Tentax
- Species: T. badasi

Binomial name
- Tentax badasi Fibiger, 2011

Species of moth

Tentax badasi is a moth of the family Erebidae, described in Brunei by Michael Fibiger in 2011.

The wingspan is about 9.5 mm.

The only known specimen was collected in secondary vegetation in an Agathis swamp forest.
