= Calvisius Sabinus =

Contemporary of Seneca

Calvisius Sabinus, whose praenomen is not recorded, was a wealthy contemporary of the younger Seneca.

Sabinus was of servile origin, and, though ignorant, he affected to be a man of learning. Seneca was contemptuous of him, noting that he had inherited his wealth from a freedman, but describing him as "a man whose reliance on slaves is so complete that he cannot even think for himself. He has bought slaves and has had them trained to memorize poetry, so that he can be cultured while having nothing in his head."

From his name, it seems that his father was a freedman of the Calvisii Sabini, a family that had been prominent in Roman politics a century earlier.

== See also ==
- Calvisia gens
