= Tentax =

Scientific classification
- Domain: Eukaryota
- Kingdom: Animalia
- Phylum: Arthropoda
- Class: Insecta
- Order: Lepidoptera
- Superfamily: Noctuoidea
- Family: Erebidae
- Subtribe: Tentaxina
- Genus: Tentax; Fibiger, 2011

Genus of moths

Tentax is a genus of moths of the family Erebidae. The genus was erected by Michael Fibiger in 2011.

== Species ==
- Tentax argentescens (Hampson, 1912)
- Tentax mini Fibiger, 2011
- Tentax vetus Fibiger, 2011
- Tentax minima (Hampson, 1926)
- Tentax makasi Fibiger, 2011
- Tentax brunnea Fibiger, 2011
- Tentax scoblei Fibiger, 2011
- Tentax penicilla Fibiger, 2011
- Tentax ferax Fibiger, 2011
- Tentax malleus Fibiger, 2011
- Tentax tentaxia Fibiger, 2011
- Tentax badasi Fibiger, 2011
- Tentax bruneii Fibiger, 2011
- Tentax musculus Fibiger, 2011
