= Publius Calvisius Ruso =

1st century Roman senator and suffect consul

Publius Calvisius Ruso was a Roman senator, who was active during the Flavian dynasty. He was suffect consul in the nundinium of March-June 79 as the colleague of Lucius Junius Caesennius Paetus. A shadowy and enigmatic figure, many of the facts of Ruso's life have been debated by the experts.

It is not disputed that Ruso was the son of the homonymous consul of 53. However, the existence of a Publius Calvisius Ruso Julius Frontinus, attested by an inscription found in Pisidian Antioch, complicates matters. At first, the consensus accepted Hermann Dessau's explanation that the two were the same man, and the inscription from Antioch merely demonstrated that Ruso had a polyonomous name, despite that the inscription also attested to a governorship of the combined province of Cappadocia-Galatia that had to be dated to the years 104 to 109. Dessau further identified this man as the husband of Dasumia, and thus great-grandfather of the emperor Marcus Aurelius.

This was the accepted consensus until the 1980s when Eric Birley published a paper wherein he voiced doubts he had for 25 years with this identification. Ronald Syme built upon Birley's arguments, and proposed that the inscription from Antioch referred to a younger half-brother of Ruso, named Publius Calvisius Ruso Julius Frontinus, the ancestor of Marcus Aurelius. Syme also proposed that the younger brother, Ruso Julius Frontinus, was the son of a sister of the prominent consular, Frontinus, explaining the similarities of name. Syme also proposed that the older son, Calvisius Ruso, had married a Dasumia, basing his reasoning on the fragmentary text of the Testamentum Dasumii; however, subsequent research and discoveries have weakened the possibility of a connection between the individuals mentioned in that inscription and Calvisius Ruso.

That there were two sons of the consul, one the nephew of Frontinus, has since been widely accepted -- but not unanimously. Ginette Di Vita-Évrard, in a paper published a few years after Syme's, argued that our Calvisius Ruso was the one who married Frontinus' sister, and thus Ruso Julius Frontinus was his son. Based on the lack of evidence for these personages, one cannot easily decide which conclusion is closest to the truth.

Political offices
Preceded by Caesar Domitianus VI, and Titus Caesar Vespasianus VII	Suffect consul of the Roman Empire; 79 with Lucius Junius Caesennius Paetus	Succeeded by unknown, then Titus Rubrius Aelius Nepos, and Marcus Arrius Flaccus as suffect consuls
