= Laelius =

Laelius is a name that can refer to:

== People ==
- Gaius Laelius, a Roman statesman, who was consul in 190 BC and friend of Scipio Africanus
- Gaius Laelius Sapiens (consul of 140 BC), a Roman statesman, son of the above, who was consul in 140 BC, and was friend to Scipio's adoptive grandson Scipio Aemilianus
- Decimus Laelius (tribune of the plebs 54 BC), one of the prosecutors Cicero opposed in the defense speech Pro Flacco
- Laelius Socinus, a 16th-century humanist and reformer

== Literature ==
- Laelius de Amicitia, a philosophical dialog by Cicero on friendship, which is based on the second Gaius Laelius and his relationships with various great men
- Sir Robert Pipon Marett, a Jersey poet who used the pen name Laelius

== Biology ==
- Laelius (wasp), genus of wasp from the subfamily Epyrinae, family Bethylidae
