= Antistia gens =

Ancient Roman family

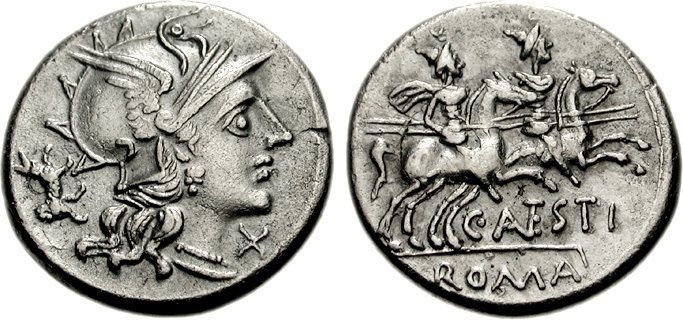
Denarius of Gaius Antistius, 146 BC. The obverse shows the head of Roma, behind which is the shape of a dog. The Dioscuri are depicted on the reverse.

The gens Antistia, sometimes written Antestia on coins, was a plebeian family at ancient Rome. The first of the gens to achieve prominence was Sextus Antistius, tribune of the plebs in 422 BC.

== Origin ==
Tradition indicates that the Antistii came to Rome from Gabii, an ancient Latin town a short distance to the east. According to Dionysius of Halicarnassus, Antistius Petro, leader of Gabii, concluded a treaty with Lucius Tarquinius Superbus, the seventh and last King of Rome. Moreover, the gens may have claimed descent from the Alban kings since Gabii was an Alban foundation and the name 'Antistius' was claimed to derive from Antho daughter of Amulius, king of Alba and uncle of Romulus and Remus. (Note: See Plutarch, "The Life of Romulus", 3, 4. On this claim see 'Ethnic Identity and Aristocratic Competition in Republican Rome', Gary D. Farney, Cambridge University Press, 2007, 288-9. Two inscriptions name a Lucius Antistius as a member of the Salii Albani. On this priesthood see M.G. Granino Cecere, "Sacerdotes Cabenses e sacerdotes Albani", pp. 275–289.)

== Praenomina ==
The oldest branches of the gens Antistia used the praenomina Sextus, Aulus, Lucius, and Marcus. In the later Republic, members of the gens also used Publius, Titus, and Gaius. The Antistii Veteres used primarily Gaius and Lucius. One Quintus appears in the imperial era.

== Branches and cognomina ==
In the earlier ages of the Republic, none of the members of the gens appear with any surname, and even in later times they are sometimes mentioned without one. The surnames under the Republic are Gragulus, Labeo, Reginus, and Vetus. The last of these, the Antistii Veteres, were the greatest of the Antistii. In 29 BC, Octavian elevated this family to the patriciate. They held several consulships from the time of Augustus to that of Antoninus Pius.

Gragulus refers to a jackdaw (graculus in Latin), which is displayed on the bronze coins of the only known Antestius with this cognomen.

== Members ==
This list includes abbreviated praenomina. For an explanation of this practice, see filiation.

- Antistius Petro of Gabii, said to have concluded a treaty with Rome in 510 BC, during the reign of Tarquin the Proud.
- Sextus Antistius, tribune of the plebs in 422 BC.
- Aulus Antistius, tribune of the plebs in 420 BC.
- Lucius Antestius, consular tribune in 379 BC.
- Marcus Antistius, tribune of the plebs circa 320 BC.
- Marcus Antistius, sent in 218 BC to the north of Italy to recall Gaius Flaminius, the consul elect, to Rome. Possibly fictitious.
- Lucius Antistius, legate sent to Sicily in 215 BC.
- Sextus Antistius, sent in 208 BC into Gaul to watch the movements of Hasdrubal.
- Gaius Antestius, triumvir monetalis in 146 BC. His coins feature a puppy, which, according to Crawford, might have stood for the surname Catulus.
- Antistia, wife of Appius Claudius Pulcher, and mother-in-law of Tiberius Gracchus.
- Lucius Antestius Gragulus, triumvir monetalis in 136 BC.
- Publius Antistius, tribune of the plebs in 88 BC, and a prominent orator, put to death by order of the younger Marius in 82.
- Antistia P. f., daughter of the orator, and the first wife of Pompeius, who, after her father's assassination, divorced her at Sulla's instigation.
- Antistius, a prosecutor of old age who fell victim to Sulla's proscriptions.
- Lucius Antistus, tribune of the plebs in 58 BC, attempted to prosecute Caesar, but was prevented from doing so by the other tribunes.
- Titus Antistius, quaestor in Macedonia in 50 BC, remained neutral during the Civil War.
- Antistius, the physician who examined the body of Caesar after his murder in 44 BC.
- Marcus Antistius Labeo, a jurist in the time of Augustus. An opponent of the triumvirs, he refused the consulship offered by Augustus because of his political views.
- Antistius Sosianus, tribune of the plebs in AD 56, and praetor in 62. He was banished by Nero during his praetorship, ostensibly for defaming the emperor in verse, but was recalled in 66 after denouncing Publius Anteius Rufus. He was banished again by Vespasian, who sought to rid himself of his predecessor's delatores.
- Lucius Antistius Rusticus, consul suffectus in AD 90.
- Gaius Antistius Auspex, eques and governor of Noricum in the first half of the second century AD.
- Quintus Antistius Q. f. Adventus Postumius Aquilinus, a general under Lucius Verus, who later served as governor of Roman Britain from about AD 175 to 178.
- Antistius Capella, one of the tutors of Commodus.
- Lucius Antistius Burrus, son-in-law of Marcus Aurelius, he was consul in AD 181, but put to death in 188 for joining a conspiracy against Commodus.
- Antistius, a writer of Greek epigrams, three of which are preserved in the Greek Anthology.
- Tiberius Antistius Fausti f. Marcianus, a military tribune with the fifteenth legion, not earlier than the latter half of the second century.

=== Antistii Regini ===
- Lucius Antistius Reginus, tribune of the plebs in 103 BC, freed his friend the consul Quintus Servilius Caepio and went into exile at Smyrna with him.
- Gaius Antistius Reginus, one of Caesar's legates in Gaul.

=== Antistii Veteres ===
- Antistius Vetus, praetor about 70 BC, and propraetor in Hispania Ulterior about 68, under whom Caesar served as quaestor.
- Antistius Vetus, tribune of the plebs in 56 BC.
- Gaius Antistius Vetus, a supporter of Caesar, and consul suffectus in 30 BC.
- Gaius Antistius C. f. Vetus, pontifex, and consul in 6 BC. Son of the consul of 30 BC
- Gaius Antistius C. f. C. n. Vetus, consul in AD 23; son of the consul of 6 BC.
- Lucius Antistius C. f. C. n. Vetus, pontifex, and consul suffectus in AD 26; son of the consul of 6 BC.
- Camerinus Antistius (C. f. C. n.) Vetus, consul suffectus in AD 46.
- Gaius Antistius (C. f. C. n.) Vetus, consul in AD 50, during the reign of Claudius.
- Lucius Antistius (C. f. C. n.) Vetus, consul in AD 55.
- Antistia L. f. (C. n.) Pollitta, wife of Gaius Rubellius Plautus.
- Gaius Antistius Vetus, consul in AD 96.
- Antistius Vetus, consul in AD 116.
- Antistius Vetus, consul in AD 150.

== See also ==
- List of Roman gentes

== Bibliography ==
- August Pauly; Georg Wissowa; Wilhelm Kroll; Kurt Witte; Karl Mittelhaus; Konrat Ziegler (eds.). Paulys Realencyclopädie der classischen Altertumswissenschaft (1840-1980). Stuttgart: J. B. Metzler.
- Marcus Tullius Cicero, Brutus, Epistulae ad Atticum, Epistulae ad Familiares, Pro Sexto Roscio Amerino.
- Gaius Julius Caesar, Commentarii de Bello Gallico (Commentaries on the Gallic War).
- Dionysius of Halicarnassus, Romaike Archaiologia (Roman Antiquities).
- Titus Livius (Livy), History of Rome.
- Valerius Maximus, Factorum ac Dictorum Memorabilium (Memorable Facts and Sayings).
- Marcus Velleius Paterculus, Compendium of Roman History.
- Sextus Julius Frontinus, De Aquaeductu (On Aqueducts).
- Marcus Valerius Martialis (Martial), Epigrammata (Epigrams).
- Publius Cornelius Tacitus, Annales, Historiae.
- Plutarchus, Lives of the Noble Greeks and Romans.
- Gaius Suetonius Tranquillus, De Vita Caesarum (Lives of the Caesars, or The Twelve Caesars).
- Lucius Annaeus Florus, Epitome de T. Livio Bellorum Omnium Annorum DCC (Epitome of Livy: All the Wars of Seven Hundred Years).
- Appianus Alexandrinus (Appian), Bellum Civile (The Civil War), Bellum Illyricum (The Illyrian War).
- Cassius Dio, Roman History.
- Chronography of 354.
- Hydatius, Chronicon (The Chronicle).
- Corpus Juris Civilis.
- Joseph Hilarius Eckhel, Doctrina Numorum Veterum (The Study of Ancient Coins, 1792–1798).
- Anthologia Graeca sive Poetarum Graecorum Lusus, ex Recensione Brunckii (The Greek Anthology, or Works of the Greek Poets, or the Collection of Brunck), Friedrich Jacobs, ed., Dyck, Leipzig (1794).
- George Crabb, Universal Historical Dictionary, Baldwin and Cradock, London (1833).
- Wilhelm Drumann, Geschichte Roms in seinem Übergang von der republikanischen zur monarchischen Verfassung, oder: Pompeius, Caesar, Cicero und ihre Zeitgenossen, Königsberg (1834–1844).
- Dictionary of Greek and Roman Biography and Mythology, William Smith, ed., Little, Brown and Company, Boston (1849).
- Theodor Mommsen et alii, Corpus Inscriptionum Latinarum (The Body of Latin Inscriptions, abbreviated CIL), Berlin-Brandenburgische Akademie der Wissenschaften (1853–present).
- René Cagnat et alii, L'Année épigraphique (The Year in Epigraphy, abbreviated AE), Presses Universitaires de France (1888–present).
- Paul von Rohden, Elimar Klebs, & Hermann Dessau, Prosopographia Imperii Romani (The Prosopography of the Roman Empire, abbreviated PIR), Berlin (1898).
- Liber Pontificalis (The Book of the Popes), ed. Louise Ropes Loomis, Columbia University Press (1916).
- T. Robert S. Broughton, The Magistrates of the Roman Republic, American Philological Association (1952).
- Badian, Ernst (1974). "The Attempt to Try Caesar". In J.A.S. Evans (ed.). Polis and Imperium: Studies in Honour of Edward Togo Salmon. Toronto: Hakkert. pp. 145–166. ISBN 0-88866-526-1.
- Michael Crawford, Roman Republican Coinage, Cambridge University Press (1974, 2001).
- Paul A. Gallivan, "The Fasti for the Reign of Claudius", in Classical Quarterly, vol. 28, pp. 407–426 (1978); "The Fasti for A.D. 70–96", in Classical Quarterly, vol. 31, pp. 186–220 (1981).
- M.G. Granino Cecere, "Sacerdotes Cabenses e sacerdotes Albani", in A. Pasqualini (editor), Alba Longa. Mito, storia, archeologia. Atti dell'Incontro di Studio, Roma-Albano Laziale, 27–29 gennaio 1994.
- Giuseppe Camodeca, "I consoli del 43 e gli Antistii Veteres d’età claudia dalla riedizione delle Tabulae Erculanenses" (The Consuls of 43 and the Antistii Veteres of the Claudian Age, from the New Edition of the Tabulae Herculanenses), in Zeitschrift für Papyrologie und Epigraphik, vol. 138, pp. 259–269 (2002).
- Andreas Krieckhaus, Senatorische Familien und ihre patriae (1./2. Jahrhundert n. Chr.), Kovač, Hamburg (2006), ISBN 3-8300-1836-3.
- Gary D. Farney, Ethnic Identity and Aristocratic Competition in Republican Rome, Cambridge University Press (2007).
- A Companion to Marcus Aurelius, Marcel van Ackeren, ed., Wiley–Blackwell (2012).
