= Marcius Censorinus =

Branch of the Marcia gens

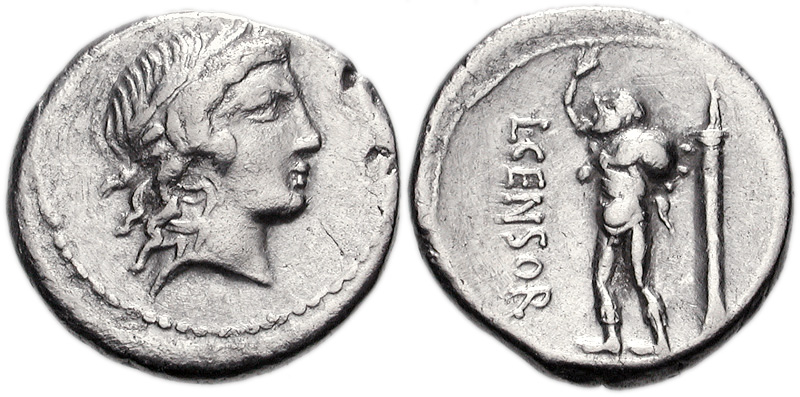
Denarius minted at Rome in 82 BC by L. Marcius Censorinus, with the head of Apollo and the figure of Marsyas the satyr (CNG)

Marcius Censorinus was a name used by a branch of the plebeian gens Marcia of ancient Rome. The cognomen Censorinus was acquired through Gaius Marcius Rutilus, the first plebeian censor, whose son used it. The gens Marcia claimed descent from both Ancus Marcius, a king of Rome, and symbolically from Marsyas the satyr, who was associated with free speech and political liberty; see further discussion at Prophecy and free speech at Rome. The Marcii Censorini were consistent populares, supporting Marius, Cinna, Julius Caesar, and Antonius.

== Members ==
- Lucius Marcius Censorinus was curule aedile in 160 BC, praetor by 152, consul in 149, and censor in 147. He was the son of a Gaius Marcius Censorinus.
- Gnaeus Marcius Censorinus was a tribune of the plebs in 122 BC.
- Gaius Marcius Censorinus was a triumvir monetalis c. 88 BC. In 87, as a military tribune or prefect, he commanded the cavalry that attacked and killed the consul Gnaeus Octavius, then brought his head to Cinna; the historian Appian remarks that this was the first time a consul's head was displayed on the Rostra, but unfortunately not the last. In 82, near the end of the civil war between Sulla and the Marian-Cinnan faction, Carbo sent Censorinus with eight legions to the aid of the besieged Praeneste, but he was ambushed by Pompeius near Sena Gallica. After Carbo fled to Africa, Censorinus was among the officers who made a last-ditch effort to break Sulla's line that culminated in defeat at the Battle of the Colline Gate.

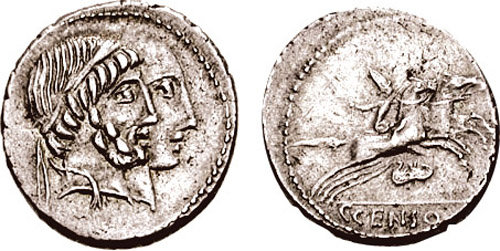
Denarius issued by the Gaius Censorinus who was moneyer in 88 BC, depicting Numa Pompilius and the gens ancestor Ancus Marcius on the obverse, with a desultor performing on two horses on the reverse

- Lucius Marcius Censorinus was a moneyer c. 82 BC, and an officer, perhaps prefect of the fleet, in 70; see also Denarius of L. Censorinus (pictured above).
- Censorinus, a friend of Publius Crassus who died with him fighting at Carrhae, was almost certainly a Marcius.
- Lucius Marcius Censorinus, whose father had the same name, was praetor in 43 BC and a partisan of Marcus Antonius. He was proconsul of the provinces of Macedonia and Achaea 42–40 BC. In 39 BC he was consul with Calvisius Sabinus, and one of the quindecimviri sacris faciundis in 17 BC.
- Gaius Marcius Censorinus was consul in 8 BC. He was proconsul of the province of Asia c. 3 BC, and was honored as patron and benefactor by the people of Miletus. He died in his province in 2 AD.
