= Aufidius Namusa =

Aufidius Namusa was a Roman jurist and writer of the 1st century BC. He was one of the numerous pupils of Servius Sulpicius Rufus. There were ten of Servius's students who wrote books (e.g. Alfenus Varus), and from the works of eight of them Namusa compiled a work which was distributed into one hundred and eighty parts or divisions (libri). The work of Namusa is cited by Ulpian, Javolenus, and Paulus and we are thus made acquainted with some of the legal opinions of Servius.
