= Gaius Norbanus Flaccus (consul 38 BC) =

Roman consul 38 BC

Gaius Norbanus Flaccus was a Roman politician and general during the 1st century BC.

Of Etruscan descent, Flaccus was the grandson of Gaius Norbanus. His family had suffered under the proscriptions of Lucius Cornelius Sulla, but had found favour under the regime of Julius Caesar. With Caesar's death, his allegiance passed to Octavianus, Caesar's adopted son.

Norbanus was first elected as praetor in 43 BC. With the establishment of the Second Triumvirate and the launching of the civil war against the Liberatores, in 42 BC Norbanus and another general, Decidius Saxa, were sent by Marcus Antonius and Octavianus with eight legions into Macedonia against the assassins of Julius Caesar. Ordered to march quickly to Thrace and hold the mountain passes, thus cutting off the Via Egnatia, Norbanus and Saxa met the combined advancing troops of Gaius Cassius Longinus and Marcus Junius Brutus in the neighborhood of Philippi. As they were outnumbered, Norbanus and Saxa occupied a position near Philippi which prevented the republicans advancing any further. Determined to find a way through, Brutus and Cassius managed to make Norbanus leave this dominating position, but Norbanus discovered the trap in time to recover it. When Brutus and Cassius managed to outflank them, Norbanus and Saxa retreated towards Amphipolis. When Marcus Antonius and the bulk of the triumvirs' troops arrived, they found Amphipolis well-guarded and Norbanus was left in command of the town. After the Battle of Philippi, Octavianus placed Norbanus in charge of his camp.

With the victory at Philippi, Norbanus enjoyed the prestige that came with being part of the successful campaign. In reward for his service, in 38 BC Octavianus nominated Norbanus as consul with Appius Claudius Pulcher. They were the first consuls to have two Quaestors each. He then held the post of proconsul in Spain from 36 - 34 BC, for which he celebrated a triumph on October 12, 34 BC. This was then followed by an appointment as proconsul of Asia shortly after the Battle of Actium in 31 BC.

Norbanus was married to a daughter of Lucius Cornelius Balbus the Younger and had at least one son, also named Gaius Norbanus Flaccus.

== Sources ==
- T. Robert S. Broughton, The Magistrates of the Roman Republic, Vol II (1952).
- Syme, Ronald, The Roman Revolution, Clarendon Press, Oxford, 1939
- Holland, Richard, Augustus: Godfather of Europe, Sutton Publishing, 2005

Political offices
Preceded by Gaius Calvisius Sabinus and Lucius Marcius Censorinus	Consul of the Roman Republic; 38 BC with Appius Claudius Pulcher	Succeeded by Lucius Caninius Gallus and Marcus Vipsanius Agrippa
