= Tentax mini =

Scientific classification
- Domain: Eukaryota
- Kingdom: Animalia
- Phylum: Arthropoda
- Class: Insecta
- Order: Lepidoptera
- Superfamily: Noctuoidea
- Family: Erebidae
- Genus: Tentax
- Species: T. mini

Binomial name
- Tentax mini Fibiger, 2011

Species of moth

Tentax mini is a moth of the family Erebidae first described by Michael Fibiger in 2011. It is found in Sri Lanka (it was described from the Ampara and Matale districts).

The wingspan is 7–7.5 mm.
