= Tentax penicilla =

Scientific classification
- Domain: Eukaryota
- Kingdom: Animalia
- Phylum: Arthropoda
- Class: Insecta
- Order: Lepidoptera
- Superfamily: Noctuoidea
- Family: Erebidae
- Genus: Tentax
- Species: T. penicilla

Binomial name
- Tentax penicilla Fibiger, 2011

Species of moth

Tentax penicilla is a moth of the family Erebidae first described by Michael Fibiger in 2011. It is found in southern Thailand and north-eastern Sumatra.

The wingspan is 10–11 mm.
