= Lucius Cornelius Lentulus Cruscellio =

Roman consul

Lucius Cornelius Lentulus (probably Lucius Cornelius Lentulus Cruscellio) (fl. 1st century BC) was a suffect consul in 38 BC, in the late Roman Republic.

== Biography ==
A member of the Patrician gens Cornelia, Cruscellio was the son of Lucius Cornelius Lentulus Crus. From September 20 through to October 23, 54 BC, he was the prosecutor who brought charges under the Lex Cornelia de maiestate against Aulus Gabinius, the ex-consul of 58 BC.

In 44 BC, he was possibly elected to the office of Praetor, and he was one of those who declared that the Senate’s allotment of provinces for the following year (during the meeting of November 28, 44 BC) was not binding.

Probably as a result of his father's support for Gnaeus Pompeius Magnus during the civil war, Cruscellio was proscribed by the ruling triumvirs. Therefore, in 42 BC, he fled to Sextus Pompey in Sicily. Sextus gave him a naval command as a Legatus, probably a legatus pro praetore. Probably after the Pact of Misenum in 39 BC, Cruscellio became reconciled to the triumvirs, and became a supporter of Marcus Antonius. As a result, he was appointed suffect consul in 38 BC, replacing Appius Claudius Pulcher.

Cruscellio was married to Sulpicia, and may have been the father of Lucius Cornelius Lentulus, consul in 3 BC.

== See also ==
- List of Roman consuls

== Sources ==
- Broughton, T. Robert S., The Magistrates of the Roman Republic, Vol. II (1951)

Political offices
Preceded by Appius Claudius Pulcher	Suffect consul of the Roman Republic; 38 BC with Lucius Marcius Philippus	Succeeded by Marcus Vipsanius Agrippa and Lucius Caninius Gallus
