= Lucius Passienus Rufus =

Roman senator

Lucius Passienus Rufus was a Roman senator and a novus homo of some oratorical talent. He was consul in 4 BC as the colleague of Gaius Calvisius Sabinus.

He inherited the name, the wealth, and the influence of his uncle Sallust. Rufus is also the grandfather of Gaius Sallustius Passienus Crispus, who was adopted by Sallustius and who married Augustus' great-granddaughter Agrippina the Younger.

The sortition awarded Passienus Rufus the proconsular governorship of Africa (circa 4/3 BC). While governor, he led a successful campaign in the frontier zone, for which he earned the ornamenta.

Political offices
Preceded by Quintus Haterius; Gaius Sulpicius Galba as suffecti	Roman consul 4 BC with Gaius Calvisius Sabinus	Succeeded by Gaius Caelius; Galus Sulpicius; Lucius Cornelius Lentulus; Marcus Valerius Messalla Messallinus
