= Livia Ocellina =

Adoptive mother of Roman emperor Galba

- Spouse: Gaius Sulpicius Galba
- Children: Galba (adoptive)
- Father: Lucius Livius Ocella

Livia Ocellina was the second wife of Gaius Sulpicius Galba and the stepmother of the Roman Emperor Galba.

== Biography ==
Her father was a Lucius Livius Ocella.

According to Suetonius she was:

a very rich and beautiful woman, who however is thought to have sought marriage with [Gaius Sulpicius Galba] him because of his high rank, and the more eagerly when, in response to her frequent advances, he took off his robe in private and showed her his deformity, so as not to seem to deceive her by concealing it.

Galba was raised by her and took on the name Lucius Livius Ocella (rather than his birth name of Servius Sulpicius Galba) during the period prior to his assumption of the purple.

== Research ==
There has been speculation that she was related to Roman empress Livia Drusilla. Ronald Syme has expressed that he does not believe that to be true.

== See also ==
- List of Roman women
