= Gaius Sulpicius Galba (consul 5 BC) =

Roman consul in 5 BC; father of Galba the Emperor

Gaius Sulpicius Galba was a Roman senator, who was active during the reign of Augustus. He was suffect consul in 5 BC as the colleague of Quintus Haterius, succeeding Lucius Vinicius.

Galba was the son of historian Gaius Sulpicius Galba, son of Servius Sulpicius Galba, a praetor in 54 BC and conspirator against Julius Caesar. His younger brother was also called Servius Sulpicius Galba. Galba was twice married. His first wife was Mummia Achaica, with whom he had two sons, Gaius consul in AD 22, and Servius, the future emperor Galba. His second wife was Livia Ocellina.

Political offices
Preceded by Lucius Vinicius as suffectus	Roman consul 5 BC (suffect) with Quintus Haterius (suffect)	Succeeded by Gaius Calvisius Sabinus; Lucius Passienus Rufus as ordinarii
