= Quintus Haterius =

Roman politician and orator during the reigns of Augustus and Tiberius (c.63 BC-AD 26)

- Died: 26 AD
- Spouse: Vipsania
- Children: Decimus Haterius Agrippa

Quintus Haterius (c. 63 BC – AD 26) was a Roman politician and orator born into a senatorial family.

== Career ==
Haterius was a populares orator under the emperor Augustus, but his style of oration was sometimes criticised. In his epistle "On the Proper Style for a Philosopher’s Discourse," Seneca states that the speech of a philosopher should be powerful yet still keep a steady pace. He refers to Quintus Haterius as an example of one who "never hesitated, never paused; he made only one start, and one stop." Even Augustus commented on his quick delivery, saying that his speech was so rapid that he needed a brake.

In 5 BC, Haterius was elected suffect consul, a consulship that filled out a term if the regular consul died or was removed from office. Tacitus mentions Haterius many times in the Annals as participating in senatorial debate.

After the death of Augustus, Tiberius made a show of reluctance to accept power so that he not look ambitious. Asinius Gallus and Haterius both urged Tiberius to set aside his modesty and assume power. Tacitus quotes Haterius as saying "How long, Caesar, will you allow the state to be without a head?" Suetonius may have also quoted Haterius without mentioning his name. Fearing Tiberius' reaction to his urging, Haterius went to the palace to beg forgiveness and threw himself at Tiberius' knees. But his clumsy effort brought the emperor to the ground, and the guards, thinking this was an attack upon Tiberius's person, pounced upon Haterius to kill him. The intervention of Livia saved his life.

Haterius was also involved in sumptuary laws. It was decided by the senate that solid gold vessels should not be used to serve food, and that it was disgraceful for men to wear silk clothes purchased from the East.

As his age advanced, however, Haterius became less well regarded. In a senate meeting discussing how to honour the two sons of Tiberius, Haterius brought forth a motion that all decrees passed that day should be erected in the Senate house in solid gold letters; but his suggestion was laughed at as being foolish.

Quintus Haterius died with the highest honours at the end of AD 26. Yet an obituary written by Tacitus stated that although he was famous for his oratory skills during his lifetime, that fame had died away and that "while the research and labours of other authors are valued by an after age, the harmonious fluency of Haterius died with him."

== Personal life ==
Haterius was the father of Decimus Haterius Agrippa and the grandfather of Quintus Haterius Antoninus. His wife was likely a daughter of Marcus Vipsanius Agrippa.

== See also ==
- Hateria gens
- List of Roman consuls

Political offices
Preceded by Imp. Caesar Divi f. Augustus XII, and Lucius Cornelius Sulla as Ordinary consuls	Suffect Consul of the Roman Empire; 5 BC with Lucius Vinicius (suffect) then Gaius Sulpicius Galba	Succeeded by Gaius Calvisius Sabinus, and Lucius Passienus Rufus as Ordinary consuls
