= Alfenus Varus =

1st-century BC Roman jurist and writer

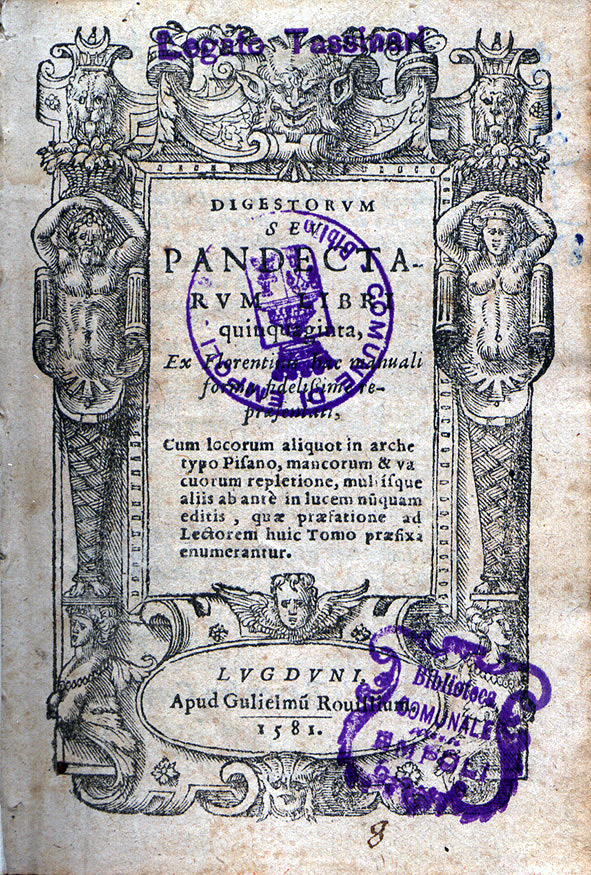
The Pandects, a compendium of Roman law which contains numerous excerpts from the Digesta of Alfenus.

Alfenus Varus was an ancient Roman jurist and writer who lived around the 1st century BC.

== Life ==
Alfenus Varus (whose praenomen might have been Publius) was a pupil of Servius Sulpicius Rufus, and the only pupil of Servius from whom there are any excerpts in the Pandects. He composed 40 books of Digesta (‘Ordered Abstracts’), a title he was the first to employ. Of this work 70 excerpts survive in Justinian's compilation of the same name, the earliest coherent passages of legal writing to be preserved.

A story about him is preserved by the scholiast Helenius Acron, in his notes on the satires of Horace. The scholiast assumes the "Alfenus Vafer" of Horace to be the lawyer, and says that he was a native of Cremona, where he carried on the trade of a barber or a botcher of shoes, that he came to Rome to become a student of Servius, attained the dignity of consulship, and was honored with a public funeral.

It is believed that Alfenus Varus the jurist is the same as the "Varus" who is addressed in Virgil's Eclogue 9 with a plea for him to save Virgil's home town of Mantua from losing its land in the confiscations of 40 BC and promising to honour him with a poem if he succeeded. Another of Virgil's poems, Eclogue 6, is indeed addressed to Varus, but it is not known to what extent Varus was able to help Mantua. It seems that Varus was the land commissioner appointed to distribute lands of northern Italy to veteran soldiers in 40 BC. A sentence of a speech by Cornelius Gallus survives criticising Varus for extending the confiscations almost up to the walls of Mantua despite having been ordered to leave a three-mile tract of land around the city. Virgil mentions Varus's military achievements (Ec. 6.7) but politely passes the task of describing them to other poets.

Varus was suffect consul in 39 BC. It is thought that the Publius Alfenus Varus who was consul in 2 AD may have been the jurist's son.

== Works ==
There are 54 excerpts in the Pandects from the 40 books of the Digesta of Alfenus; but it is conjectured that Alfenus may have acted only as the editor of the work of Servius. It appears from the fragments of Alfenus that he was acquainted with the Greek language, and these fragments show that he wrote in a pure and perspicuous style. A passage that appears in the Pandects shows that he was not a stranger to the speculations of the philosophers. According to Aulus Gellius, Alfenus was somewhat curious in matters of antiquity, and Gellius quotes a passage from the thirty-fourth book of his Digest in which Alfenus mentions one of the terms of a treaty between the Romans and the Carthaginians. Alfenus is often cited by later jurists. The fragments in the Pandects are taken from the second to the seventh books of the Digest and there are fragments from the eighth book taken from the epitome by the jurist Paulus. The entire number of books appears from the Florentine Index; the passage in Gellius quotes the thirty-fourth book; and a passage of Paulus cites the forty-ninth book. Whether the epitome of Paulus went further than the eighth book or not, is uncertain.

The passage in Gellius: "Alfenus ... in libro Digestorum trigesimo et quarto, Conjectaneorum autem secundo," ("Alfenus says in the Digest and in the Conlectanea") &c., has given rise to some discussion. It is clear that the passage in the Conlectanea is attributed to Alfenus, and it is also clear that only one passage is meant; or at most the same passage is referred to as being in two different works. But apparently only one work is meant, and therefore we must conclude that the Digesta, which consisted of forty books, contained a subdivision called the Conlectanea. Some critics have conjectured that the Conlectanea is the compilation of Aufidius Namusa, so that the passage cited by Gellius appeared in both the original work by Alfenus, and in the copious compilation of Namusa, which is made from Alfenus and other pupils of Servius.

== See also ==
- Alfena (gens)

Political offices
Preceded by Gaius Calvisius Sabinus	Consul of the Roman Republic c. October–December 39 BC with Lucius Marcius Censorinus; Gaius Cocceius Balbus	Succeeded by Ap. Claudius Pulcher; Gaius Norbanus Flaccus
