= Censorinus (died 53 BC) =

Roman of the 1st century BC

Censorinus (died 53 BC) was a friend and contemporary of Publius Crassus, son of the triumvir Marcus Crassus. His gens name was almost certainly Marcius, and he may have been the son of the Gaius Marcius Censorinus who was monetalis around 88 BC. If so, his father and uncle Lucius were staunch supporters of the popularist faction of Cinna.

Censorinus is one of the two named friends of Publius Crassus who died with him at the Battle of Carrhae. Plutarch calls him "a man of senatorial dignity and a powerful speaker." During the battle, Censorinus is among those who ride with young Crassus on a last desperate cavalry foray; after sustaining heavy casualties, the Romans and their Gallic auxiliaries retreat to a sand dune, where hope is soon lost under the constant barrage of Parthian arrows. Wounded and with his sword-arm incapacitated, Crassus orders his shield-bearer to take his life. Censorinus does likewise, and dies at his side. Their friend Megabocchus and most of the other officers commit suicide.

This Censorinus is possibly also the young man who had accompanied Quintus Cicero to Asia, as mentioned in a letter written by Quintus's elder brother Marcus Cicero between 25 October and 10 December, 59 BC. He is named in the company of four other young nobiles who seemed willing to support Quintus if he were to be prosecuted as a result of his governorship. The others are an Antonius who is either the famous Marcus Antonius or one of his two brothers, Gaius or Lucius; Cassius Longinus and his brother Lucius; and Quintus Mucius Scaevola (tribune of the plebs in 54 BC). Other close members of the Censorinus family were supporters of Antonius as triumvir, and one of them, the consul of 39 BC, came into possession of Cicero's house on the Palatine after his death.

== See also ==
- Marcius Censorinus
