= Tentax bruneii =

Scientific classification
- Domain: Eukaryota
- Kingdom: Animalia
- Phylum: Arthropoda
- Class: Insecta
- Order: Lepidoptera
- Superfamily: Noctuoidea
- Family: Erebidae
- Genus: Tentax
- Species: T. bruneii

Binomial name
- Tentax bruneii Fibiger, 2011

Species of moth

Tentax bruneii is a moth of the family Erebidae first described by Michael Fibiger in 2011. It is found in Brunei.

The wingspan is about 9.5 mm.

The only known specimen was collected by day in a lowland forest.
