= Eclogue 6 =

Pastoral poem by Virgil

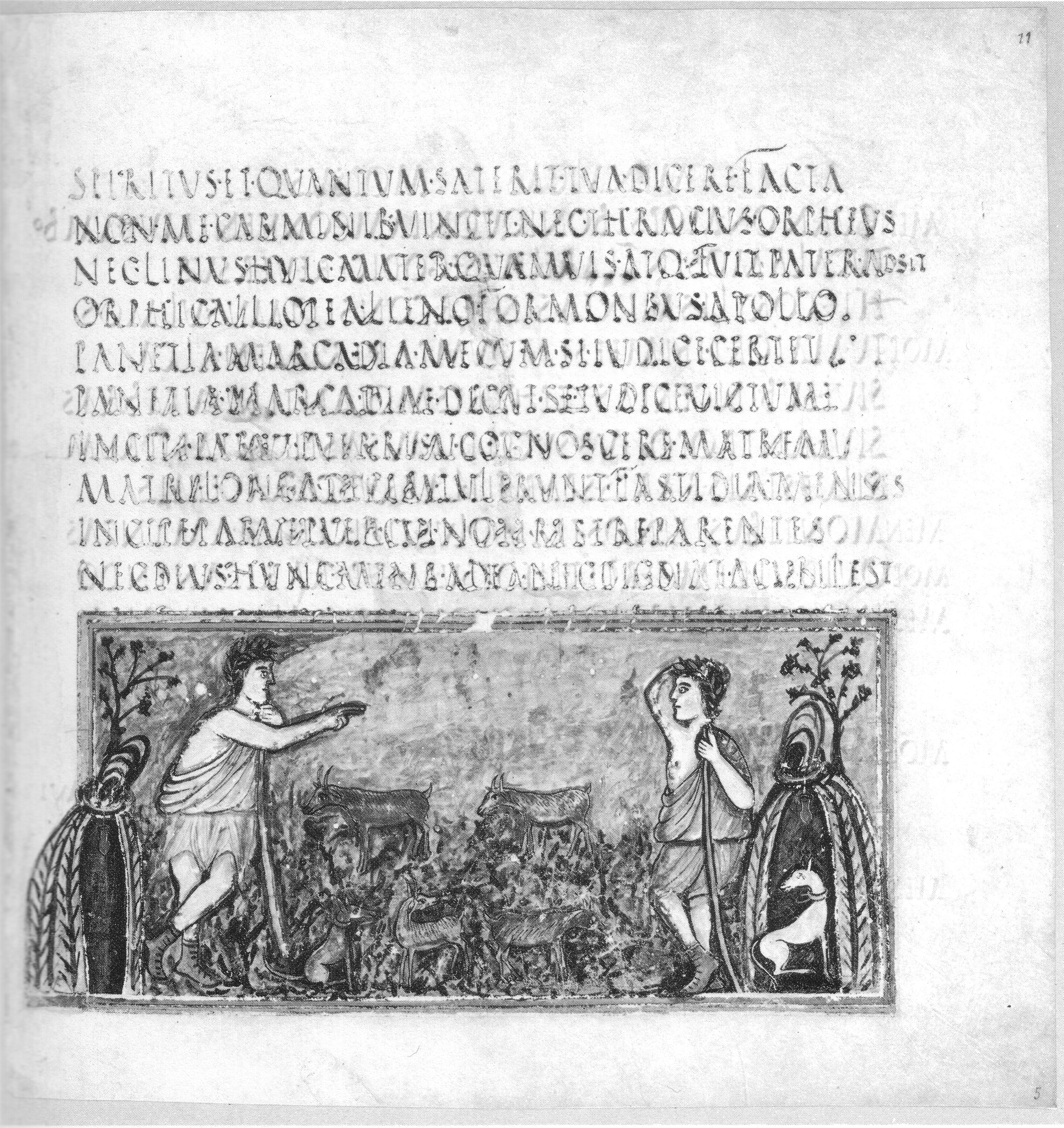
Vergilius Romanus, fol. 11 r. (Eclogue 6, ll. 80–6)

Eclogue 6 (Ecloga VI; Bucolica VI) is a pastoral poem by the Latin poet Virgil. In BC 40, a new distribution of lands took place in North Italy, and Alfenus Varus and Cornelius Gallus were appointed to carry it out. At his request that the poet would sing some epic strain, Virgil sent Varus these verses.

The poet speaks as though Varus had urged him to attempt epic poetry and excuses himself from the task, at the same time asking Varus to accept the dedication (line 12) of the pastoral poem which follows, and which relates how two shepherds caught Silenus and induced him to sing a song containing an account of the creation and many famous legends.

== Context ==
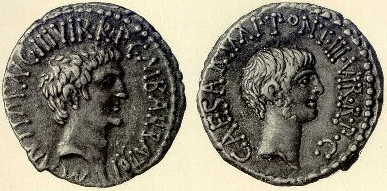
Silver denarius of the Second Triumvirate: 41 BC. Octavian (right, obv.); Antony (left, rev.)

After the Perusine war (41 BC) Pollio, who had been legate in Transpadane Gaul and aided Virgil to recover his farm (see Eclogue 1), had been superseded, as being a partisan of Antony, by an adherent of Octavian called Alfenus Varus. This change of circumstances seems to have caused some difficulty to Virgil, and he is said to have nearly lost his life in a contest with Arrius, a centurion, to whom his farm had been assigned. Also, in BC 40, a new distribution of lands took place in North Italy, and Alfenus Varus, with the poet Cornelius Gallus, was appointed to carry it out (compare Eclogue 9). Varus and his friend Gallus (see Eclogue 10) helped Virgil, who addresses this Eclogue to his patron.

== Summary ==
The poem may be summarised as follows:

1 Virgil begins by explaining that his Muse, Thalea, first deigned to play songs in "Syracusan" verse (i.e. imitating those of Theocritus, who came from Syracuse, Sicily); when he attempted to write epic poetry ("kings and battles") Apollo checked him with the words, "Tityrus, a herdsman ought to pasture fat sheep, but sing thin poetry". He says he will therefore leave the task of singing Varus's military exploits to others, but nonetheless wishes to honour Varus by inscribing his name at the top of his poem. No page is more welcome to Apollo than one which is dedicated to Varus.

13 He then goes on to tell a story of how two boys, Chromis and Mnasyllus, came across the mythical figure Silenus sleeping drunk in a cave and tied him up in his own garlands. Soon they were joined by a naiad called Aegle, who playfully painted his forehead with mulberry juice. Then Silenus laughed, and agreed to sing the boys a song; Aegle would have a different reward. When he began to sing, Fauns and wild animals began to play, and oak trees to move their branches.

31 Silenus sings how the world began when, in a vast void, the seeds of the Earth, Soul, Sea, and Fire were gathered together; how land and sea separated, things gradually took form, the sun appeared for the first time, rain fell from the sky, woods grew up and wild animals roamed the mountains.

41 He then recounts a cycle of the old Greek myths, beginning with Pyrrha, who recreated the human race by throwing stones after the Great Flood, the Golden Age of Saturn, Prometheus who stole fire and was punished for it in the Caucasus mountains, the boy Hylas, who drowned in a pool on the voyage of the Argonauts, and Pasiphaë, who fell in love with a bull – a madness worse than that of the daughters of Proetus, who imagined they were cows; he imagines the lament Pasiphaë sang as she vainly hunted for her bull in the mountain forests of Crete.

61 Then he tells the story of Atalanta, who was defeated in a foot race because she stopped to admire the golden apples of the Hesperides; the sisters of Phaethon, who were turned into poplar trees when mourning for their brother; how the poet Gallus was greeted by the Muses on Mount Helicon, where the singer Linus presented him with the Muses' panpipes and bade him sing of Apollo's sacred grove at Gryneium in Asia Minor.

74 Silenus continued with the story of Scylla, whose lower parts consisted of barking dogs, the story of King Tereus, who raped his sister-in-law Philomela, and all the other songs which the god Apollo once sang beside the River Eurotas in mourning for his beloved Hyacinthus.

84 Silenus continued to sing until evening came and he ordered the sheep to be gathered in to their stables.

== Acrostic ==
In the introduction to Silenus's song (lines 14–24) Neil Adkin discovered an acrostic, consisting of the word LAESIS, meaning 'for those who have been harmed'. This occurs twice, reading both upwards and downwards from the same letter L in line 19. It is thought that this refers to the landholders in Mantua who had been harmed by Alfenus Varus's land confiscations in 41 BC. Thus although Virgil ostensibly dedicates the poem to Varus, the real dedicatees are the farmers whom Varus forced to leave their lands. The last line of the acrostic (24) solvite me, pueri; satis est potuisse videri 'release me, boys; it is enough to be seen to have been able' could also be interpreted as 'solve me, boys; it is enough to have been able to be seen', a possible pointer to the presence of the acrostic. The poem also contains praise of Cornelius Gallus, who, apart from his role as a poet, is said to have made a speech criticising Varus for confiscating land right up to the walls of Mantua when he had been ordered to leave a margin of 3 miles.

== Sources and further reading ==
- Adkin, N. (2014). "Read the edge: Acrostics in Virgil's Sinon Episode". Acta Classica Universitatis Scientiarum Debreceniensis.
- Courtney, E. (1990). "Vergil's Sixth Eclogue". Quaderni Urbinati di Cultura Classica, New Series, Vol. 34, No. 1 (1990), pp. 99–112.
- Elder, J. P. (1961). "Non Iniussa Cano: Virgil's Sixth Eclogue". Harvard Studies in Classical Philology. 65: 109–125. doi:10.2307/310834. JSTOR 310834.
- Greenough, J. B., ed. (1883). Publi Vergili Maronis: Bucolica. Aeneis. Georgica. The Greater Poems of Virgil. Vol. 1. Boston, MA: Ginn, Heath, & Co. pp. 16–18. (public domain)
- Page, T. E., ed. (1898). P. Vergili Maronis: Bucolica et Georgica. Classical Series. London: Macmillan & Co., Ltd. pp. 131–9. (public domain)
- Paschalis, M. (1993). "Two Implicit Myths in Virgil's Sixth Eclogue". Vergilius (1959–). 39: 25–29. JSTOR 41592488.
- Putnam, Michael C. J. (1970). Virgil's Pastoral Art: Studies in the Eclogues. Princeton, NJ: Princeton University Press. pp. 195–221. ISBN 978-0-691-06178-8.
- Rutherford, R. B. (1989). "Virgil's Poetic Ambitions in Eclogue 6". Greece & Rome. 36 (1): 42–50. doi:10.1017/S0017383500029326. JSTOR 643184.
- Segal, C. (1969). "Vergil's Sixth Eclogue and the Problem of Evil". Transactions and Proceedings of the American Philological Association. 100: 407–435. doi:10.2307/2935924. JSTOR 2935924.
- Seider, A. M. (2016). "Genre, Gallus, and Goats: Expanding the limits of pastoral in Eclogues 6 and 10". Vergilius (1959-), Vol. 62 (2016), pp. 3–23.
- Wilkinson, L. P. (1966). "Virgil and the Evictions". Hermes, 94(H. 3), 320–324.
