= Megabocchus =

Megabocchus (died 53 BC) was a friend and contemporary of Publius Crassus, son of the triumvir Marcus Crassus. He died at the Battle of Carrhae.

Plutarch gives the name as Μεγάβαγχος. The Latin spelling varies. His father may have been the Gaius Megabocchus mentioned by Cicero as condemned for extortion in Sardinia. The son is also named by Cicero in a letter to Atticus dated April 59 BC, during Julius Caesar's first consulship. Megabocchus is there connected with an unsuccessful candidate for the year's other consular office who was a close associate of the elder Crassus. Although the context is difficult, Megabocchus appears to be cast as the ringleader of a bunch of party-boys–turned–agitators.

During the Battle of Carrhae, Megabocchus is among those who ride with young Crassus on a last desperate cavalry foray. Plutarch says he was about Publius's age, distinguished for his courage and strength. After sustaining heavy casualties, the Romans and their Gallic auxiliaries retreat to a sand dune, where hope is soon lost under the constant barrage of Parthian arrows. Wounded and with his sword-arm incapacitated, Crassus orders his shield-bearer to take his life. Megabocchus, along with most of the other officers, commits suicide rather than yield to the enemy.

== See also ==
- Battle of Carrhae
- Publius Licinius Crassus
- Censorinus
