= Tentax tentaxia =

Scientific classification
- Domain: Eukaryota
- Kingdom: Animalia
- Phylum: Arthropoda
- Class: Insecta
- Order: Lepidoptera
- Superfamily: Noctuoidea
- Family: Erebidae
- Genus: Tentax
- Species: T. tentaxia

Binomial name
- Tentax tentaxia Fibiger, 2011

Species of moth

Tentax tentaxia is a moth of the family Erebidae first described by Michael Fibiger in 2011. It is found on Borneo (it was described from Sarawak, near Kuching).

The wingspan is about 11 mm.
