= Tentax minima =

Scientific classification
- Kingdom: Animalia
- Phylum: Arthropoda
- Class: Insecta
- Order: Lepidoptera
- Superfamily: Noctuoidea
- Family: Erebidae
- Genus: Tentax
- Species: T. minima

Binomial name
- Tentax minima (Hampson, 1926)

Synonyms
- Anachrostis minima Hampson, 1926

Species of moth

Tentax minima is a moth of the family Erebidae first described by George Hampson in 1926. It is found in Indonesia (Sumbawa).

The wingspan is about 7 mm.
