= Lucius Cornelius Sulla (consul 5 BC) =

1st century BC Roman senator and consul

Lucius Cornelius Sulla was a Roman senator of the Augustan age. He was ordinary consul as the colleague of Augustus in 5 BC. The only other office attested for him was as a member of the Septemviri epulonum, which he was co-opted into after his praetorship.

Ronald Syme believed he was a son of Publius Cornelius Sulla, designated consul for 65 BC, which made him a grandnephew of the Roman dictator Lucius Cornelius Sulla. The son of Lucius, Cornelius Sulla, was expelled from the Senate by Tiberius in AD 17.

Political offices
Preceded by Decimus Laelius Balbus, and Gaius Antistius Vetus as Ordinary consuls	Consul of the Roman Empire; 5 BC with Imp. Caesar Divi filius Augustus XII	Succeeded by Quintus Haterius, and Lucius Vinicius as Suffect consuls
