= Tentax musculus =

Scientific classification
- Domain: Eukaryota
- Kingdom: Animalia
- Phylum: Arthropoda
- Class: Insecta
- Order: Lepidoptera
- Superfamily: Noctuoidea
- Family: Erebidae
- Genus: Tentax
- Species: T. musculus

Binomial name
- Tentax musculus Fibiger, 2011

Species of moth

Tentax musculus is a moth of the family Erebidae first described by Michael Fibiger in 2011. It is found in Brunei.

The wingspan is about 10.5 mm.
