= Lucius Junius Caesennius Paetus =

1st century Roman senator, soldier and consul

Lucius Junius Caesennius Paetus (c. 45 - after 94) was a Roman senator active during the Flavian dynasty. He was suffect consul for the nundinium of March-June 79 with Publius Calvisius Ruso as his colleague.

Caesennius was the son and namesake of Lucius Caesennius Paetus, consul in 61, and Flavia Sabina, the daughter of Titus Flavius Sabinus.

Paetus is known to have served as a military tribune in 62 under Domitius Corbulo. Despite the military reverses of his father, his career was not unduly harmed, for Paetus was Consul Suffectus and finally proconsular governor of Asia in 93/94.

Political offices
Preceded by Caesar Domitianus VI, and Titus Caesar Vespasianus VII	Suffect consul of the Roman Empire; 79 with Publius Calvisius Ruso	Succeeded by unknown, then Titus Rubrius Aelius Nepos, and Marcus Arrius Flaccus as suffect consuls
