= Decimus Laelius Balbus =

Roman consul 6 BC

Decimus Laelius Balbus was a Roman senator, who was active during the reign of Augustus. He was consul in 6 BC with Gaius Antistius Vetus as his colleague. Balbus was the grandson of Decimus Laelius, plebeian tribune in 54 BC, and thus a novus homo.

Balbus was one of the Quindecimviri sacris faciundis who organized the Secular Games in 17 BC. Ronald Syme notes his membership in this prestigious Roman priesthood led to Balbus entering the consulate twelve years later. "That fact itself renders this novus homo not a little enigmatic," Syme writes, "but consecrates the value and significance of priesthoods as well as consulships."

Political offices
Preceded by Tiberius Claudius Nero II, and Gnaeus Calpurnius Piso	Consul of the Roman Empire; 6 BC with Gaius Antistius Vetus	Succeeded by Imp. Caesar Divi filius Augustus XII, and Lucius Cornelius Sulla Faustus
