= Denarius of L. Censorinus =

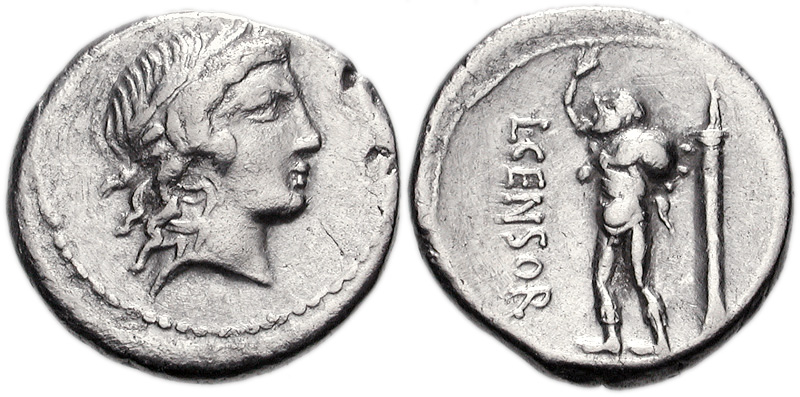
Denarius minted at Rome in 82 BC by L. Censorinus, with the head of Apollo and the figure of Marsyas holding a wineskin

In 82 BC, a denarius was minted by Lucius Marcius Censorinus picturing Apollo and Marsyas the satyr. The coin has attracted several interpretations because of the ambiguity of its symbolism.

== Coin description ==
On the obverse of this coin is a representation of the god Apollo, portrayed as a young man wearing a diadem. On the reverse of the coin is an image of the satyr Marsyas, nude, carrying a wineskin. He is wearing a Phrygian cap, and has a pedestal standing beside him, holding a statue, which some think is a statue of Minerva. Along the side is the inscription L. Censor. The image of Marsyas may be copied from a statue in the Roman Forum at this time, as implied by the pedestal in the field of the coin. The coin is silver and weighs roughly 3.95 grams.

== Symbolism ==
=== The Marcius gens ===
The symbolism may refer to the moneyer’s family line, the gens Marcia, who claimed legendary descent from Marsyas. An ancestor claimed to have experienced a vision which led to the founding of games in tribute to Apollo. The brother of Lucius, Gaius Marcius Censorinus, minted a coin with the image of Apollo.

=== Political climate ===
Another view of the symbolism in this coin is that it is politically driven. Apollo was seen as a symbol of harmony, especially in his manifestation at Rome. During this time, Rome was experiencing a period of political upheaval, connected to the Social Wars. Marsyas was regarded as a symbol of political freedom, particularly free speech. On the coin, Marsyas is wearing a Phrygian cap, a symbol of liberty.

L. Marcius Censorinus was a supporter of Marian or Cinnan politics, which advanced the cause of Roman citizenship for Italians during the Social Wars. Gaius Marcius Censorinus was captured at the Battle of the Colline Gate and beheaded by an order of Sulla, the champion of the Senate's traditional privileges. Many other supporters of Marian politics used images of Apollo on their coins, often in conjunction with images of Saturn, Venus and a god who is known as a young Jupiter.

=== Warding off plague? ===
The image of Apollo on the coin may refer to the plague of 87 BC. Censorinus may have been invoking the god in his capacity as a healer and protector.
