= Tentax argentescens =

Scientific classification
- Kingdom: Animalia
- Phylum: Arthropoda
- Class: Insecta
- Order: Lepidoptera
- Superfamily: Noctuoidea
- Family: Erebidae
- Genus: Tentax
- Species: T. argentescens

Binomial name
- Tentax argentescens (Hampson, 1912)

Synonyms
- Tolpia argentescens Hampson, 1912

Species of moth

Tentax argentescens is a moth of the family Erebidae first described by George Hampson in 1912. It is found in Sri Lanka.

The wingspan is 10–13 mm.
