= Lucius Vinicius (consul 5 BC) =

Roman politician

Lucius Vinicius (fl. 1st century BC) was a Roman Senator who was appointed suffect consul in 5 BC.

Vinicius was the son of Lucius Vinicius, who was suffect consul in 33 BC. A noted advocate with a brilliant speaking voice, he was appointed to the post of Triumvir monetalis in 16 BC. Vinicius was later appointed suffect consul in 5 BC, replacing the emperor Augustus, after which he disappears from the historical record.

Suetonius reported that Augustus was once forced to intervene when Vinicius was seen lavishing too much attention on the emperor's daughter, Julia, reportedly seeing her when she was staying at Baiae.

== Sources ==
- Syme, Ronald, The Augustan Aristocracy (1986). Clarendon Press.ISBN 978-0-19-814859-3

Political offices
Preceded by Imp. Caesar Divi f. Augustus XII, and Lucius Cornelius Sulla as Ordinary consuls	Suffect Consul of the Roman Empire; 5 BC with Quintus Haterius (suffect)	Succeeded by Gaius Sulpicius Galba as Suffect consul
