= Gaius Antistius Vetus (consul 6 BC) =

Roman senator

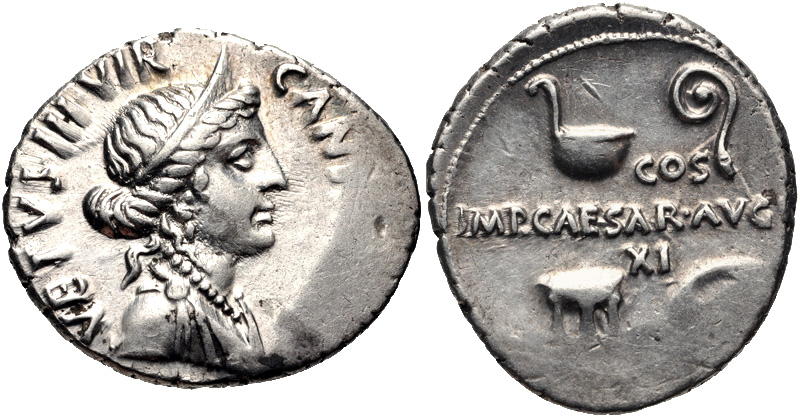
Denarius minted by Gaius as monetary magistrate (16-15 BC).

Gaius Antistius Vetus was a Roman senator active during the early Roman Empire, and a consul in 6 BC as the colleague of Decimus Laelius Balbus.

== Biography ==
Antistius was the son of Gaius Antistius Vetus, consul in 30 BC. Between 26 and 24 BC, Antistius participated in the Cantabrian Wars, serving with the Emperor Augustus for most of the campaign as a legate. Together with his colleague Gaius Firmius, they fought a difficult campaign to subdue the Gallaeci tribes of the more remote forested and mountainous parts of Gallaecia bordering the Atlantic Ocean, defeating them only after a series of severe battles, though the details of this particular campaign remain unknown.

Due to the Emperor's illness, Antistius commanded the five legions of Rome at the Siege of Aracillum in 25 BC. Antistius served with Augustus at Amaya, Bergida, and Monte Vindio, and after the successful campaign, went on to become the provincial governor (Proconsul) of Hispania Citerior.

Antistius began his political career as a triumvir monetalis in 16–15 BC. He returned to Rome to serve as consul, in 6 BC, and later he served as the Proconsul of Asia in either AD 2/3 or 3/4, assisted by his oldest son Gaius Antistius Vetus.

His sons, Gaius and Lucius, became Roman consuls in the years 23 and 26 respectively. Velleius Paterculus notes that he was still living in AD 30.

== See also ==
- Antistia gens
- Siege of Aracillum
- Cantabrian Wars

Political offices
Preceded by Tiberius Claudius Nero II; Gnaeus Calpurnius Piso	Roman consul 6 BC with Decimus Laelius Balbus	Succeeded by Caesar Augustus XII; Lucius Cornelius Sulla
