= Aracillum =

Fortified Cantabrian city

Coordinates: 43°01′48″N 4°08′01″W

Aracillum was a fortified Cantabrian city, scene of the third of the great battles of the Cantabrian wars (year 26 BC according to the chronology of E. Martino) between the Roman Empire and Cantabrian indigenous tribes. It would be located in the territory of present-day Cantabria, with two possible locations: Aradillos, near Reinosa and the Roman city of Julióbriga; the second possible location would be the castro of the Galician Thorn, in the Mountains of the Shield. According to Roman historiography it belonged to the blendii.

== Aracillum in the classical texts ==
In Floro's account of the war, and according to Eutimio Martino's translation, it is said that "third, the fortress of Aracillum resists with great thrust; nevertheless, it was taken" (tertio Aracelium oppidum magna vi repugnat; captum tamen.) For his part, Orosio writes that "later, the fortress of Racilium, although it resisted with great force and for a long time, was finally taken and razed" (racilium deinde oppidum magna vi ac diu repugnans, postmodern captum ac dirutum est.)

== Location ==
There are two theories for the location of this fort. Curiously, Aracillum was almost the only battle in which the main researchers agreed on its location (traditional hypothesis), but the discovery of new archaeological remains in Cantabria has made a new hypothesis appear.

- Traditional hypothesis: the Aracillum fort would be located in the south of Cantabria, in the Aradillos area (Campoo de Enmedio.) Already in 1768, in his work La Cantabria, Father Enrique Flórez pointed out "the place that today they call Aradillos, little disfigured from Aracillo". Also Aureliano Fernández-Guerra in his study Cantabria identifies "the battle of Aracillo or Atracillo, Aradillos, above Reinosa." Adolf Schulten agrees, who bets on Aradillos, specifically on the 1200-meter mountain that has been close to the current town. More recently, E. Martino points out the set of Roman roads and moats (especially the Riaño de Argacillo moats, which he identifies as another toponym derived from Aracillum, and La Muela) to point out that “the plateau served as a Roman position against the top of El Raposo, which has ruined walls," once the Aracillum fort was surpassed by the Romans.
- New hypothesis: the discovery of a pre-Roman Cantabrian fort and high altitude Roman camps in the Galician Thorn (Mountains of the Shield, Cantabria) by Eduardo Peralta Labrador (doctor in Protohistory and Archeology by the University of Paris," Federico Fernández and Roberto Ayllón has led to the appearance of this new hypothesis that would identify said fort with Aracillum. The fort is located at about 1000 meters of altitude and is made up, according to Peralta, "of a great fortress…remains of an acropolis protected by lines of walls, and imposing walls of that fortress." In the vicinity of the fortress there would be four more pre-Roman forts, as well as at least three Roman camps. In addition they have been a Roman denarius of 42 AD, a catapult projectile, a legionnaire's pilum and other pieces. Peralta rejects the identification of Aracillum with Aradillos because Aradillos is a "militarily indefensible" site and proposes the Galician Thorn instead because it coincides "with the references and sources of the classic Floro and Orosio." Furthermore, he argues that this area "was the best natural entrance to the coast...it is located in front of the bay of the Cantabrian capital, Portus Victoriae, where the reinforcements brought by the fleet from Aquitaine had to take place." Indeed, he contends that the sites of the Galician Thorn show the first archaeological evidence "of the Cantabrian wars throughout the northern Cantabrian Mountains."

== Works cited ==
- Fernández-Guerra y Orbe, Aureliano (1878). Cantabria. Madrid: Fortanet Printing. OCLC 1044411500.
- Flórez, Enrique (1877). Cantabria. Dissertation on the Site and Extension that in the Time of the Romans Had the Cantabrian Region with News of the Confines and Several Ancient Populations. Preliminary to Volume XXIV of Sacred Spain, in which It is the Province of Tarragona, for… (3rd ed.). Madrid: J. Rodríguez Printing. OCLC 609487762.
- Martino, Eutimio (1982). Rome against Cantabrians and Asturians: New Reading of the Sources. Santander: Sal Terrae. ISBN 8429306307. OCLC 12696047.
- Schulten, Adolf (1943). Cantabrians and Asturians and Their War with Rome. Madrid: Espasa-Calpe. OCLC 504255830.
