= Calvisia gens =

Ancient Roman family

The gens Calvisia was an ancient Roman family, which first rose to prominence during the final decades of the Republic, and became influential in imperial times. The first of the gens to obtain the consulship was Gaius Calvisius Sabinus in 39 BC.

== Origin ==
The nomen Calvisius is probably based on the Latin adjective calvus, meaning "bald". Both Calvus and its diminutive, Calvinus, were common Roman surnames. With respect to their place of origin, Ronald Syme begins a survey of the evidence by stating, "Calvisii might issue from any region of Italy except old Latium." He lists a placename, "villa Calvisia" in Southern Etruria, amongst the properties of a Hadrianic consular; two Calvisii attested in Puteoli, and fifteen named in sources from Transpadane Italy, but concludes "[y]et they lead nowhere"; the evidence is frustratingly inconclusive. However, for one branch of the gens, the Calvisii Rusones, Syme suggests that their origins lay in Gallia Narbonensis. A further clue lies in the surname Sabinus, borne by the only distinct family of the early Calvisii, which may point to a Sabine origin.

== Praenomina ==
The main lines of the Calvisii employed the praenomina Gaius and Publius, both of which were amongst the most common of Roman names.

== Branches and cognomina ==
Most of the Calvisii appearing in history belong to one of two distinct families, bearing the surnames Sabinus and Ruso. Sabinus, belonging to the earlier of the two, typically indicated Sabine ancestry, although as an adjective it could also suggest that the original bearer resembled a Sabine, either in his appearance or manner. The Calvisii Sabini flourished from the end of the Republic to about the time of the emperor Claudius, when the surname is replaced by that of Ruso. The latter surname might be formed from rus, the country, or russus, ruddy or red-haired; the latter derivation is suggested by the fact that two later Calvisii, whose relationship to the others is unclear, bore the surname Rufus, which generally referred to someone with red hair.

== Members ==
This list includes abbreviated praenomina. For an explanation of this practice, see filiation.

=== Calvisii Sabini ===
- Gaius Calvisius (Sabinus), father of the consul of 39 BC
- Gaius Calvisius C. f. Sabinus, legate of Caesar during the Civil War, he secured Aetolia in BC 48, and three years later he was assigned the province of Africa. He was praetor in 44, and consul in 39. He became one of the trusted friends and commanders of Octavian, who sent him against Sextus Pompeius.
- Gaius Calvisius C. f. C. n. Sabinus, consul in 4 BC.
- Calvisia Flaccilla, daughter of C. Calvisius Sabinus the consul of 4 BC, she married Marcus Claudius Marcellus Aeserninus the praetor of 19 AD.
- Gaius Calvisius (C. f. C. n.) Sabinus, consul in AD 26. He was one of those accused of maiestas in 32, but saved by the tribune Celsus, who was one of the informers. He was governor of Pannonia under Caligula, when he and his wife, Cornelia, were accused of plotting against the emperor. Seeing no hope of escape, they took their own lives.
- Publius Calvisius Sabinus Pomponius Secundus, consul suffectus in AD 44, subsequently triumphed over the Chatti. He was a notable poet and tragedian. He is presumed to have been adopted by a Publius Calvisius Sabinus.

=== Calvisii Rusones ===
- Publius Calvisius Ruso, consul suffectus, perhaps from the Kalends of November, in AD 53.
- Publius Calvisius P. f. Ruso, consul suffectus in AD 79, from the Kalends of March to the Kalends of September.
- Publius Calvisius P. f. P. n. Ruso Julius Frontinus, consul suffectus, perhaps in AD 84.
- Publius Calvisius Tullus Ruso, consul in AD 109 and maternal grandfather of emperor Marcus Aurelius.
- (Calvisia) Domitia P. f. Lucilla, daughter of the consul of 109 and mother of Marcus Aurelius.

=== Others ===
- Gaius Calvisius Rufus, a close friend of Pliny the Younger.
- Publius Calvisius Philotas, put up an epitaph honoring his brother Servius Cornelius Julianus.
- Calvisia, wife of Servius Cornelius Julianus, both mentioned on an inscription thanking Flavia Domitilla of the Flavian dynasty.
- Gaius Calvisius Statianus, prefect of Roman Egypt from AD 170 to 176.
- Calvisius Rufus, governor of Britannia Inferior during the reign of Severus Alexander, between AD 222 and 235.
- Calvisius Sabinus, the son of a freedman, whose wealth and pretension earned him the scorn of the younger Seneca.

== See also ==
- List of Roman gentes

== Bibliography ==
- Marcus Tullius Cicero, Epistulae ad Familiares, Philippicae.
- Gaius Julius Caesar, Commentarii de Bello Civili (Commentaries on the Civil War).
- Lucius Annaeus Seneca (Seneca the Younger), Epistulae Morales ad Lucilium (Moral Letters to Lucilius).
- Gaius Plinius Secundus (Pliny the Elder), Naturalis Historia (Natural History).
- Gaius Plinius Caecilius Secundus (Pliny the Younger), Epistulae (Letters).
- Marcus Fabius Quintilianus (Quintilian), Institutio Oratoria (Institutes of Oratory).
- Publius Cornelius Tacitus, Annales, Historiae, Dialogus de Oratoribus (Dialogue on Oratory).
- Plutarchus, Lives of the Noble Greeks and Romans.
- Appianus Alexandrinus (Appian), Bellum Civile (The Civil War).
- Lucius Cassius Dio Cocceianus (Cassius Dio), Roman History.
- Dictionary of Greek and Roman Biography and Mythology, William Smith, ed., Little, Brown and Company, Boston (1849).
- Theodor Mommsen et alii, Corpus Inscriptionum Latinarum (The Body of Latin Inscriptions, abbreviated CIL), Berlin-Brandenburgische Akademie der Wissenschaften (1853–present).
- George Davis Chase, "The Origin of Roman Praenomina", in Harvard Studies in Classical Philology, vol. VIII (1897).
- T. Robert S. Broughton, The Magistrates of the Roman Republic, American Philological Association (1952).
- E. Mary Smallwood, Documents Illustrating the Principates of Nerva, Trajan and Hadrian, Cambridge University Press (1966).
- Anthony R. Birley, The Fasti of Roman Britain, Clarendon Press (1981).
- Paul A. Gallivan, "The Fasti for the Reign of Claudius", in Classical Quarterly, vol. 28, pp. 407–426 (1978), "The Fasti for A.D. 70–96", in Classical Quarterly, vol. 31, pp. 186–220 (1981).
- Ronald Syme, "P. Calvisius Ruso. One Person or Two?", in Zeitschrift für Papyrologie und Epigraphik, vol. 56 (1984).
- Suzanne Dixon, Childhood, Class and Kin in the Roman World, Routledge (2001).
- Setälä, Päivi (1977). Private Domini in Roman Brick Stamps of the Empire: A Historical and Prosopographical Study of Landowners in the District of Rome. Suomalainen tiedeakatemia. ISBN 9789514103032.
- Jeffers, James S. (1991). Conflict at Rome: Social Order and Hierarchy in Early Christianity. Fortress Press. ISBN 9780800624699.
