= Gaius Antistius Vetus (consul 30 BC) =

Gaius Antistius Vetus was a Roman politician and general who was consul suffectus in 30 BC as the colleague of Augustus, succeeding Marcus Licinius Crassus.

== Biography ==
Vetus was a descendant of the Plebeian Roman house of the Antistii Veteres. He was probably the son of Gaius Antistius Vetus, praetor in 70, and governor in 69 BC in Hispania Ulterior, under whom Julius Caesar served as quaestor.

Initially a supporter of Caesar, Vetus was appointed Quaestor pro praetore of Syria by Caesar, a position which he held in 45 BC. He was forced to fight against Quintus Caecilius Bassus, the former governor and an opponent of Caesar, who refused to relinquish his post. Vetus besieged him until the Parthians came to relieve Bassus; during this time Vetus was hailed as imperator.

On his way back to Rome in 44 BC, he was intercepted by Brutus, one of Caesar's leading assassins, who persuaded him not only to hand over the province's revenues which he was taking to Rome, but also to join the cause of the Liberatores. In June 43 BC he was back in Rome but soon returned to Brutus where he served as one of his legates. Fleeing after the defeat of Brutus at Philippi, Vetus eventually became reconciled with Marcus Antonius and Octavianus.

In 35 BC, Vetus was given command of the ongoing war against the Salassi, perhaps as the governor of Transalpine Gaul, which he prosecuted with vigour, but without success. Then in 30 BC, he was awarded the position of consul suffectus, serving alongside Octavianus for a portion of the year. Vetus was adlected to the patriciate along with other prominent Plebeians in 29 by Octavian who had been given legal authority to expand the patrician class through the Lex Saenia of 30 BC. Vetus was made legate of Hispania Citerior in 26 BC, one of the few men of consular standing to be given a military province during the reign of Augustus. He took over from Augustus after the Princeps fell ill whilst on campaign in Spain, leading a campaign together with P. Carusius against the Astures which they successfully concluded in 25 BC.

His son, Gaius Antistius Vetus, served as consul in 6 BC. Two of his grandsons also went on to become consuls.

== See also ==
- Antistia gens

== Sources ==
- T. Robert S. Broughton, The Magistrates of the Roman Republic, Vol II (1952).
- Syme, Ronald, The Roman Revolution, Clarendon Press, Oxford, 1939.
- Anthon, Charles & Smith, William, A New Classical Dictionary of Greek and Roman Biography, Mythology and Geography (1860).

== Notes ==
Political offices
Preceded by Marcus Licinius Crassus as consul ordinarius	Roman consul 30 BC (suffect) with Imp. Caesar divi f. IV	Succeeded by Marcus Tullius Cicero as suffect consul
