= Tentax makasi =

Scientific classification
- Domain: Eukaryota
- Kingdom: Animalia
- Phylum: Arthropoda
- Class: Insecta
- Order: Lepidoptera
- Superfamily: Noctuoidea
- Family: Erebidae
- Genus: Tentax
- Species: T. makasi

Binomial name
- Tentax makasi Fibiger, 2011

Species of moth

Tentax makasi is a moth of the family Erebidae first described by Michael Fibiger in 2011. It is found in Indonesia (Sulawesi).

The wingspan is about 10 mm (0.39 in).
