= Decimus Laelius =

Tribune of the plebs in 54 BC

Decimus Laelius (born late-90s/early 80s BC) was a tribune of the plebs of the Roman Republic in 54 BC. In 59 BC, he was the lead prosecutor in the extortion case against L. Valerius Flaccus, who was defended by Cicero in the speech Pro Flacco.

Laelius served under Pompeius Magnus as envoy and naval prefect in 49 and 48 BC, during the civil war against Julius Caesar. Cicero accuses him of bringing the case against Flaccus at the instigation of Pompeius.

== Prosecuting Flaccus ==
Cicero shows perhaps uncharacteristic regard for the opposing counsel by calling him "the son of the best sort of man" and "a good young man, from a respectable background, and eloquent," but emphasizes his youth by repeatedly referring to him as an adulescens, the usual term in the Late Republic for a young man not yet having entered the cursus honorum or political career track. The implication is that the prosecution is an attempt to boost his career. Laelius appears to have had a strong and well-presented case, and yet:

The more conscientiously Laelius performed his duties as prosecutor, the more Cicero mocked him as a young man goaded by an irrational passion to cause the ruin of a model Roman noble. The more carefully the prosecutors managed the case down to the last detail, the more Cicero implied that the need for such management showed that it was an inherently bad case.

Laelius presented the Greek and Jewish witnesses at the trial, while his co-counsel, the son of Gaius Appuleius Decianus, handled Roman citizens who had been living abroad. One of the accusations brought by Laelius was that Flaccus had tried to bribe Decianus. Cicero impugns Laelius's witnesses by their ethnicity.

Although Macrobius later records Flaccus's guilt, the former governor was acquitted. Flaccus may have won the case because of bias, but a general awareness of his guilt is indicated by his failure to advance to the consulship, an achievement that would have been expected based on his family history.

== Later career ==
Laelius was a consistent Pompeian supporter. As tribune in 54 BC, Laelius gave his support to Aulus Gabinius, another Pompeian associate, when he was prosecuted and convicted by Memmius.

During the civil war, Laelius recruited for Pompeius in Syria and Asia. In February 49 BC, he was a special envoy to the consuls Claudius Marcellus and Lentulus Crus at Capua, with the task of urging their retreat to Brundisium.

== Family connections ==
Laelius's loyalty to Pompeius dated back to his father, who had died serving under the young Pompeius in Spain around 77 BC. Cicero's use of the word "respectable" (honestus) instead of "noble" (nobilis) to describe his family background suggests that he was not descended from the consular Laelii. This Laelius was, however, an ancestor of the Laelii Balbi of the Imperial era.

== Selected bibliography ==
- Alexander, Michael Charles. The Case for the Prosecution in the Ciceronian Era. University of Michigan Press, 2002, pp. 80–97. Limited preview online.
- Broughton, T.R.S. The Magistrates of the Roman Republic, vol. 2, 99 B.C.–31 B.C. (New York: American Philological Association, 1952), pp. 223, 265, 270, 578.
