= Gaius Calvisius Sabinus (consul 4 BC) =

Gaius Calvisius Sabinus (born c. 36 BC) was a Roman Senator who was appointed consul in 4 BC.

== Biography ==
Calvisius Sabinus was the son of Gaius Calvisius Sabinus, who was consul in 39 BC. Following in his father's footsteps, he is presumed to have been elected as one of the Septemviri epulonum, probably sometime after 12 BC, and possibly after the death of Marcus Vipsanius Agrippa or Appius Claudius Pulcher.

Calvisius Sabinus was elected to the consulship as an imperial candidate in 4 BC. During his consulship he introduced and spoke in favour of an imperial edict which strengthened the rights of people designated as allies of Rome in recovering money that may have been extorted from them.

Calvisius Sabinus had at least one son, Gaius Calvisius Sabinus, who was elected consul in AD 26.

== See also ==
- Calvisii Sabini, for others with a similar name

== Sources ==
- Syme, Ronald (1986). The Augustan Aristocracy. Clarendon Press. ISBN 978-0-19-814859-3.

Political offices
Preceded by Quintus Haterius, and Gaius Sulpicius Galba as Suffect consuls	Consul of the Roman Empire; 4 BC with Lucius Passienus Rufus	Succeeded by Gaius Caelius (Rufus?), and Galus Sulpicius as suffect consuls
