= Ars Vetus =

Ars vetus may refer to

- The ars antiqua in medieval European music
- The logica vetus in medieval European logic
