= Tentax vetus =

Scientific classification
- Domain: Eukaryota
- Kingdom: Animalia
- Phylum: Arthropoda
- Class: Insecta
- Order: Lepidoptera
- Superfamily: Noctuoidea
- Family: Erebidae
- Genus: Tentax
- Species: T. vetus

Binomial name
- Tentax vetus Fibiger, 2011

Species of moth

Tentax vetus is a moth of the family Erebidae first described by Michael Fibiger in 2011. It is found in south-eastern and central eastern India.

The wingspan is 11.5–13 mm.
