= Marcus Acilius Glabrio (consul 33 BC) =

1st-century BC Roman senator

Marcus Acilius Glabrio (Note: Acilius' name and relationship to the other Acilii are far from certain. In older sources he was thought to be one of the Acilii Aviolae, rather than the Glabriones; it remains uncertain which identification is correct. His praenomen is also given as Manius, which was the favoured name of both branches of the gens; Marcus was a much more common name, and frequently substituted for Manius by mistake, although in this case it could also be that Manius has erroneously been substituted for Marcus due to the family's known use of the name.) (fl. 1st century BC) was a Roman senator who was appointed consul suffectus in 33 BC.

== Biography ==
Acilius was a Roman politician from the gens Acilia and a supporter of the Second Triumvirate. He may have been the son of Manius Acilius Glabrio, consul suffectus in 67 BC. In 33 he was appointed one of four consuls who succeeded Octavianus after he resigned the office. Acilius probably held the office from July to October.

In 25, Acilius was appointed the proconsular governor of Africa.

== Sources ==
- PIR ² A 71
- Broughton, T. Robert S. (1952). The Magistrates of the Roman Republic, 99 B.C.-31 B.C. Vol. 2. New York: American Philological Association. OCLC 1120836609.

Political offices
Preceded by Lucius Flavius as suffect	Roman consul 33 BC (suffect)	Succeeded by Lucius Vinicius as suffect
