= Lucius Vinicius (consul 33 BC) =

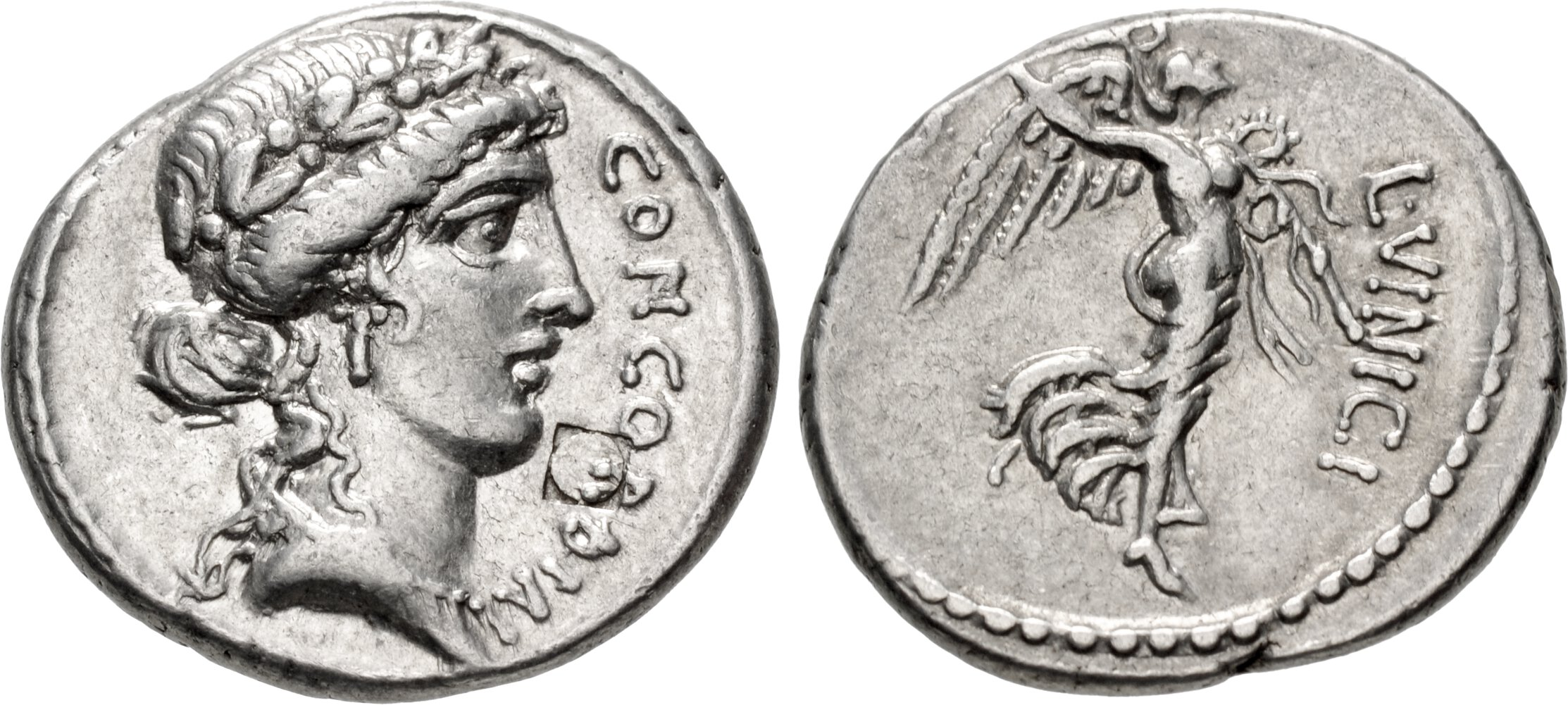
Denarius minted by Vinicius in 52 BC.

Lucius Vinicius (fl. 1st century BC) was a Roman politician. A supporter of Julius Caesar, he was tribune of the plebs in 51 BC and suffect consul in 33 BC.

== Biography ==
Vinicius was a Novus homo whose family originated at Cales in Campania, and who were members of the Roman equestrian order. His unknown father was named Marcus.

Vinicius was a supporter of Julius Caesar at a time of confrontation with the Senate and Pompey. He was appointed triumvir monetalis in 52. The coins he minted featured Concordia and allusions to Pompey's four triumphs, perhaps to advocate a reconciliation between Caesar and Pompey.

Vinicius was elected tribune of the plebs for 51, during which time he vetoed an anti-Caesarean resolution of the Senate together with three other tribunes.

His support for Caesar and then Augustus saw him appointed as suffect consul in 33 BC, replacing Marcus Acilius Glabrio, and serving from October through to the end of December. He was later appointed the Proconsular governor of Asia, probably serving from 27 BC through to 25 BC.

Vinicius had at least one son, Lucius Vinicius, who was appointed suffect consul in 5 BC.

== Bibliography ==
- T. Robert S. Broughton, The Magistrates of the Roman Republic, American Philological Association, 1951–1952.
- Michael Crawford, Roman Republican Coinage, Cambridge University Press, 1974, ISBN 9780521074926.
- Syme, Ronald, The Augustan Aristocracy (1986). Clarendon Press.ISBN 978-0-19-814859-3

Political offices
Preceded by Marcus Acilius Glabrio	Consul of the Roman Republic; October–December 33 BC with Quintus Laronius (suffect)	Succeeded by Gn. Domitius Ahenobarbus; Gaius Sosius
