= Appius Claudius Pulcher (consul 38 BC) =

Roman politician (fl. 38 BCE)

Appius Claudius Pulcher was a Roman politician. An early supporter of Augustus, he was elected consul in 38 BC.

== Biography ==
A member of the patrician branch of the Claudii family, Pulcher was the son of Gaius Claudius Pulcher, praetor in 56 BC. He or his brother was adopted by their paternal uncle Appius Claudius Pulcher, the consul of 54 BC, and took on his praenomen, thus both of the brothers were named "Appius Claudius Pulcher". Both brothers prosecuted Titus Annius Milo in 51 BC for the murder of their other uncle Publius Clodius Pulcher, and managed to convict him with the help of Pompey. (Note: There is some confusion as to which of the two Appius Claudius Pulchers who prosecuted Milo in 51 BC was the consul of 38 BC. Given that the other Appius Claudius Pulcher was impeached for extortion by the Servilii, it is assumed that the one adopted by his uncle (the former consul Appuis Claudius Pulcher) was the one who became consul in his turn in 38 BC.)

Originally a supporter of Mark Antony following the death of Julius Caesar, Pulcher had some sympathy towards the Liberatores, and showed some willingness to join Decimus Junius Brutus Albinus. However, by 38 BC, the year he was elected consul, he had attached himself to the cause of Octavian, one of the earliest patricians to publicly join the heir of Julius Caesar. This alliance may have came about as a result of the marriage of Octavian to the aristocratic Livia Drusilla, and by doing so, he attached his auctoritas to Octavian's rising power and fortune, and was greatly rewarded by Octavian in the years to come.

In 36 BC, during Octavian's war with Sextus Pompey, Pulcher was given command of the rear guard of Octavian's fleet as it sailed from Puteoli, which then suffered some damage in a storm. Then in 34 BC, he was proconsul in one of the provinces in Hispania where he remained for two years, during which time he was awarded the title imperator. In 32 BC, Pulcher was back in Rome where he celebrated a triumph on 1 June. After this, Pulcher was given no further military commands, and by 31 BC he had been made a member of the Septemviri epulonum.

Pulcher likely had at least one son, Appius Claudius Pulcher, who may have been put to death by the emperor Augustus on charges of adultery with the emperor's daughter Julia. Marcus Valerius Messalla Appianus, the ordinary consul of 12 BC (who was probably adopted by Marcus Valerius Messalla) may have been his son or possibly his nephew instead.

== See also ==
- List of Roman consuls

== Sources ==
- T. Robert S. Broughton, The Magistrates of the Roman Republic, Vol II (1952).
- Syme, Ronald, The Roman Revolution (1939)
- Anthon, Charles & Smith, William, A New Classical Dictionary of Greek and Roman Biography, Mythology and Geography (1860).

Political offices
Preceded by Gaius Cocceius Balbus; Publius Alfenus Varus	Consul of the Roman Republic; 38 BC; With: Gaius Norbanus Flaccus	Succeeded by Lucius Cornelius Lentulus
