= Lucius Marcius Censorinus (consul 39 BC) =

Roman consul in 39 BC

Lucius Marcius Censorinus was a consul of the Roman Republic in 39 BC, during the Second Triumvirate. He and his colleague Gaius Calvisius Sabinus had been the only two senators who tried to defend Julius Caesar when he was assassinated on the Ides of March in 44 BC, and their consulship under the triumvirate was a recognition of their loyalty.

Marcius Censorinus was proconsul of Macedonia and Achaea from 42 to 40 BC. He and a Fabius Maximus were the last proconsuls honored abroad with the title "savior and founder" and with a festival bearing their names before the establishment of the imperial monarchy under Augustus. Following the civil wars of the 40s, Censorinus took possession of Cicero's beloved house on the Palatine.

== Family ==
The Marcii Censorini were a branch of the plebeian gens Marcia, but Ronald Syme notes their "ancestral prestige, barely conceding precedence to the patriciate." They had been supporters of Gaius Marius and were consistent populares throughout the civil wars of the 80s and 40s–30s. Lucius's father, who had the same name, was one of Sulla's enemies in 88 BC.

Censorinus's daughter (or possibly his sister) married Lucius Sempronius Atratinus, suffect consul in 34 BC. His son Gaius Marcius Censorinus was consul in 8 BC.

== Political and military career ==
Censorinus was praetor in 43 BC, evidently praetor urbanus before he went to Mutina in support of Marcus Antonius, if a caustic remark by Cicero is to be trusted. Along with others who joined Antonius, he was declared a public enemy by the senate.

After the Battle of Philippi in 42 BC, Antonius left Censorinus in charge of Macedonia and Achaea, where he remained as proconsul until he was relieved by Asinius Pollio in late 40 BC.

Censorinus celebrated a triumph over Macedonia on the first day of his consulship in 39 BC. It has been argued that the triumph was meant to display a new concordia, the recently reaffirmed unity among the triumvirs and their power to honor their supporters, and marked Censorinus's achievements only secondarily. Like his consular colleague Calvisius Sabinus, Censorinus began as a partisan of Antonius, but successfully navigated the political shoals as Octavian acquired sole power.

Among his other rewards for loyalty, Censorinus was allowed to buy Cicero's house on the Palatine, which the orator had exerted such strenuous efforts to restore after its confiscation in connection to his exile. Its value was reckoned at 3,500,000 sesterces. Although the Palatine house, along with Cicero's other confiscated property following his death, was sold ostensibly at public auction, the symbolism of its possession can hardly have been left to chance. The house next passed to T. Statilius Taurus, whom Cicero notoriously associated with Calvisius.

As consuls, Censorinus and Calvisius brought a proposal to the Roman Senate on behalf of representatives from Aphrodisias, who complained of abuses during the civil wars. The city was accordingly granted status as an independent ally and received additional benefits and privileges.

== Priesthood ==
In the inscription that records the quindecimviri sacris faciundis who administered the Secular Games of 17 BC, Censorinus occupies the most senior position, second only to Marcus Agrippa. He would have been a member of this priestly college (collegium) as early as 31 BC, and in 17 would have been of rather advanced age.

Because he is known to have been active during this time, he is sometimes thought to be the Marcius Censorinus to whom Horace addresses Carmen 8 of his fourth book of odes. This Censorinus is identified more often as Lucius's son Gaius, the lesser-known consul of 8 BC.

== See also ==
- Marcius Censorinus

== Selected bibliography ==
Unless otherwise noted, dates, offices, and citations of ancient sources from T.R.S. Broughton, The Magistrates of the Roman Republic (American Philological Association, 1952), vol. 2, pp. 338–339, 362, 374, 382, 386, 426–427; vol. 3 (1986), pp. 48–49.

- Syme, Ronald. The Roman Revolution. Oxford University Press, 1939, reissued 2002.
- Syme, Ronald. The Augustan Aristocracy. Oxford: Clarendon Press, 1986.

Political offices
Preceded by Lucius Cornelius Balbus; Publius Canidius Crassus as suffecti	Roman consul 39 BC; With: Gaius Calvisius Sabinus	Succeeded by Gaius Cocceius Balbus; Alfenus Varus as suffecti
