= Titus Antistius =

1st century BC Roman politician

Titus Antistius was a man of ancient Rome who served as quaestor in Macedonia in 50 BC. When the leader Pompey came into the province in the following year, Antistius had received no successor; and according to Cicero, he did only as much for Pompey as circumstances compelled him. During this time, Pompey compelled Titus to coin silver for him.

Antistius took no part in the war, and after the Battle of Pharsalus went to Bithynia, where he saw Julius Caesar and was pardoned by him. He died at Corcyra (modern Corfu) on his return, leaving behind him considerable property.

Antistius is known almost solely because of his mention in Cicero's correspondence with Lucius Munatius Plancus.
