= Gaius Calvisius Sabinus (consul 39 BC) =

Roman general and statesman

Gaius Calvisius Sabinus was a consul of the Roman Republic in 39 BC under the Second Triumvirate. He and his consular colleague Lucius Marcius Censorinus had been the only two senators who tried to defend Julius Caesar when his assassins struck on 15 March 44 BC, and their consulship under the triumvirate is taken as a recognition of their loyalty. An inscription, described by Ronald Syme as "one of the most remarkable inscriptions ever set up in honour of a Roman senator," praises Calvisius for pietas, his sense of duty or devotion. As a military officer, Calvisius is notable for his long service and competence, though he was not without serious defeats.

== Family, origin, and affiliations ==
Gaius Calvisius Sabinus is the only member of the gens Calvisia listed in Broughton's Magistrates of the Roman Republic as holding office during the Republican era. He is one of several novi homines ("new men") who achieved not only the consulship but triumphal honors during the 30s BC. He is the first consul whose nomen gentilicium has the non-Latin ending -isius. The ethnic cognomen "Sabinus" ("Sabine") is found with the nomen Calvisius for the first time in his name, but inscriptions point toward a probable origin in the Latin colony of Spoletium (Spoleto). He belonged to the voting tribe Horatia.

His son and grandson, both of whom carried the same name, were consuls, the son in 4 B.C. under Augustus, toward whom the father had demonstrated consistent loyalty. The grandson held the office under Tiberius and continued his political career as a Roman governor under Caligula, but maintaining loyalty had become a trickier matter: he and his wife, a Cornelia, were accused of conspiring against the emperor and committed suicide.

== Civil wars of the 40s ==
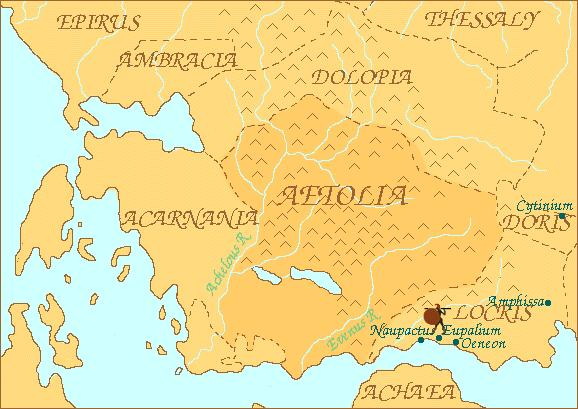
Calvisius took possession of Aetolia for the Caesarian faction in 48 BC

During the civil wars of the 40s, Calvisius Sabinus was an officer under Caesar. In 48 BC, Caesar received envoys from Aetolia and Thessaly. In response, he sent Calvisius to Aetolia and L. Cassius Longinus to Thessaly. Calvisius commanded five cohorts and a small number of cavalry, drawn from the legion that had garrisoned Oricum. Caesar's reference marks Calvisius's first appearance in the historical record. Both Cassius and Calvisius were charged with maintaining the supply of grain for the army. The Aetolians welcomed Calvisius, and he was able to capture Calydon and Naupactus from Caesar's opposition and gained possession of the region.

=== Praetor and governor ===
Calvisius was praetor possibly in 46, but more likely in 44 BC. In 45, he was governor of Africa Vetus, the province formed from Carthaginian territory after the Third Punic War, while C. Sallustius Crispus, the historian usually known as Sallust, became the first governor of Africa Nova, the province created by Caesar from the former kingdom of Numidia. The previous year, the senatorial forces had rallied in Africa after their defeat at Pharsalia, and the Battle of Thapsus meant that the outcome of the war had been determined on African soil. Calvisius had returned to Rome sometime before 15 March 44, when he was present in the senate during Caesar's assassination, but he had left two legates at Utica who may have caused trouble for his successor, Quintus Cornificius.

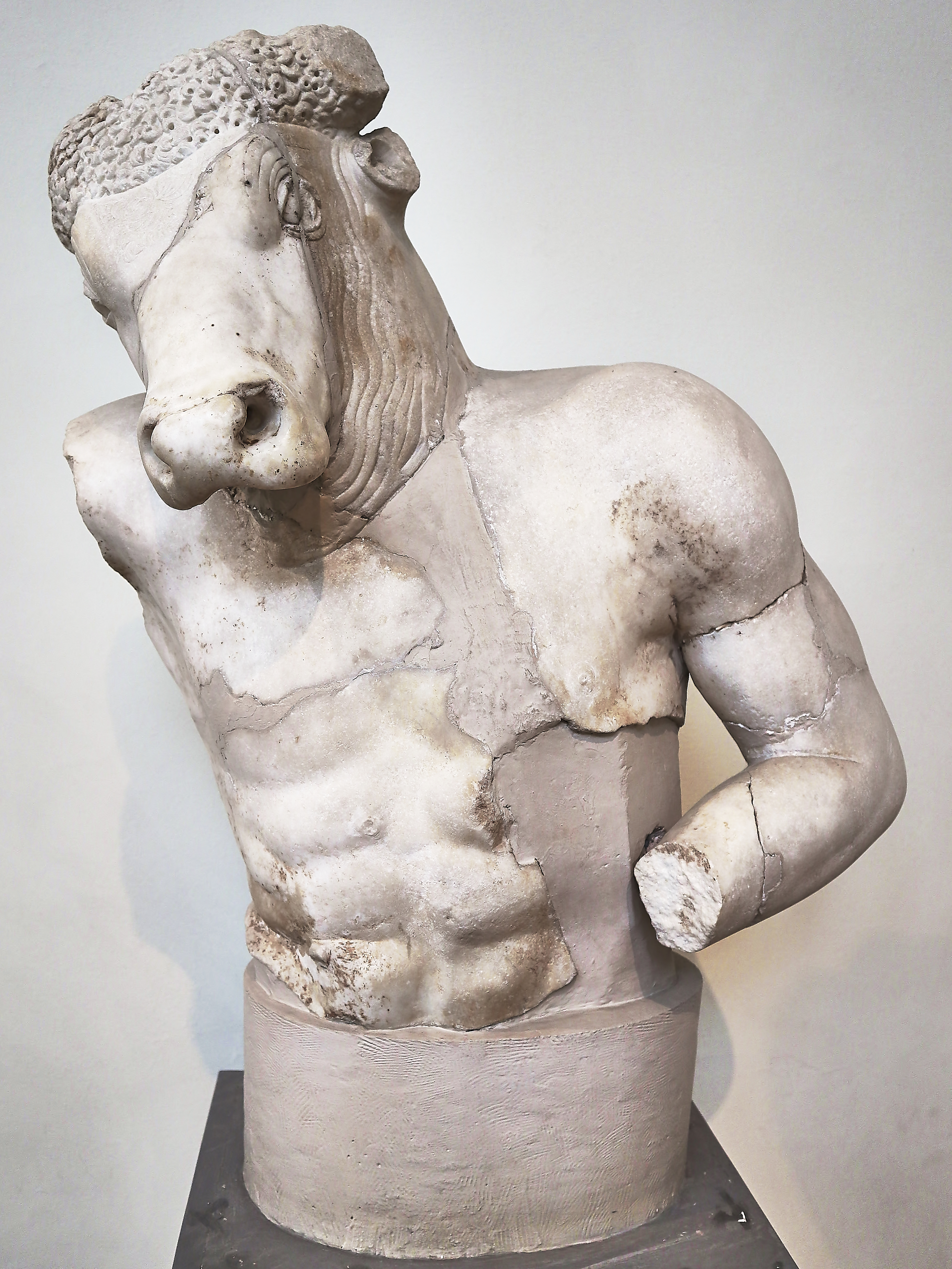
The Minotaur in a 5th-century BC representation

On 28 November 44 BC, Marcus Antonius called a meeting of the senate to reallocate several provinces, including Africa Vetus, to be assigned for the following year. Cicero lists Calvisius among the fourteen who received provinces, but despite Antonius's efforts, Cornificius refused to cede Africa Vetus. The reallocation of Antonius was annulled on 20 December.

In a letter to Cornificius dated March 43 BC, Cicero pejoratively linked Calvisius to T. Statilius Taurus, consul in 37 and 26 BC and governor of Africa in 36, calling them jointly "the Minotaur" in a play on the latter's cognomen. It has been conjectured that Taurus was nominated to serve as a legate under Calvisius in Africa, but the reasons for the characterization of the two as "a dual and fabulous monster" are unclear from the context, other than Cicero's general efforts to undermine Calvisius in favor of his friend Cornificius.

== Consulship ==
As consuls, Calvisius and Censorinus proposed that the senate redress grievances alleged by representatives of Aphrodisias, who had enjoyed the patronage of Julius Caesar but had endured "steep exactions" by Marcus Brutus and Antonius and an invasion by Titus Labienus. The senate then passed a decree granting the town independence and various benefits.

== Civil wars of the 30s ==
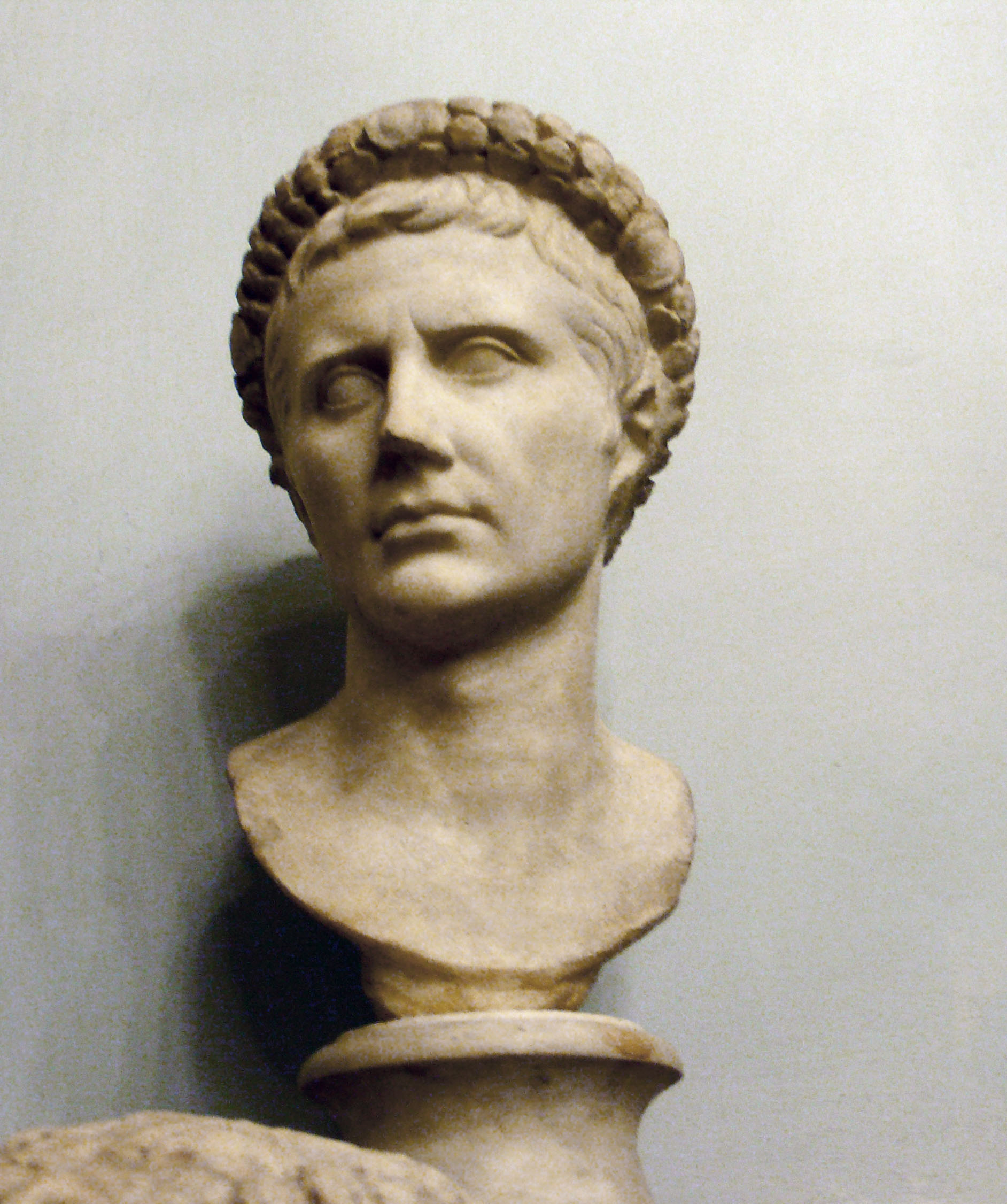
Octavian wearing the civic crown after becoming Augustus

During the Sicilian revolt, Calvisius commanded a fleet that he brought from Etruria in 38 BC to join Octavian at the straits of Sicily. The other admiral in Octavian's navy was Lucius Cornificius. Near Cumae Calvisius battled the part of Sextus Pompeius's fleet commanded by Menecrates. Thus delayed, he joined Octavian only at the end of the fateful naval battle at Messana. A storm broke up both fleets, destroying Octavian's flagship, and the victory belonged to Sextus. The Greek historian Appian narrates the battle at dramatic length. Demonstrations against Octavian and the war broke out in Rome in response. In 37, Calvisius was held responsible and replaced as admiral when his subordinate Menas defected with a half-dozen ships to Sextus Pompeius.

After Pompeius was defeated, Octavian gave Calvisius the promagisterial assignment of policing and restoring order to Italy in 36–35 BC, at which task he was at least temporarily successful. Calvisius's loyalties lay firmly on the side of Octavian during the final war of the Roman Republic; Plutarch says Calvisius's tales of how Antonius deferred to Cleopatra were so extravagant they were largely disbelieved.

In 31, he was one of the septemviri epulones and held the office of curio maximus, whose duty was to collect religious contributions from the curiae. Calvisius was proconsul in Spain from as early as 31. An inscription in Spain records a Calvisius Sabinus, flamen of Roma and the Divine Augustus, who donated grain to the people of Clunia when the market had driven up prices to unaffordable levels. Although this benefactor was probably a local man who had been granted Roman citizenship by the proconsul, he may have been the proconsul himself. Calvisius returned to Rome in 28, and on May 26 celebrated a triumph, one of three awarded out of Octavian's triumviral provinces in 28. He was a likely candidate for a second consulship for 25 BC, but no further office is known for him.

He may be the Sabinus named in Catalepton 10.

== See also ==
- Calvisii Sabini, for others with a similar name

== Selected bibliography ==
Unless otherwise noted, dates, offices, and citations of ancient sources from T.R.S. Broughton, The Magistrates of the Roman Republic (American Philological Association, 1952), vol. 2, pp. 280, 295, 308, 327, 392, 397, 401, 421, 428; vol. 3 (1986), pp. 48–49.

- Syme, Ronald. The Roman Revolution. Oxford University Press, 1939, reissued 2002.
- Syme, Ronald. Sallust. University of California Press, 1964.
- Syme, Ronald. "Senators, Tribes and Towns." Historia 13 (1964) 105–125.
- Ronald Syme, The Augustan Aristocracy. Oxford: Clarendon Press, 1986.

Political offices
Preceded by Lucius Cornelius Balbus; Publius Canidius Crassus	Roman consul 39 BC with Lucius Marcius Censorinus	Succeeded by Publius Alfenus Varus
