= 60s =

Seventh decade of the first century AD

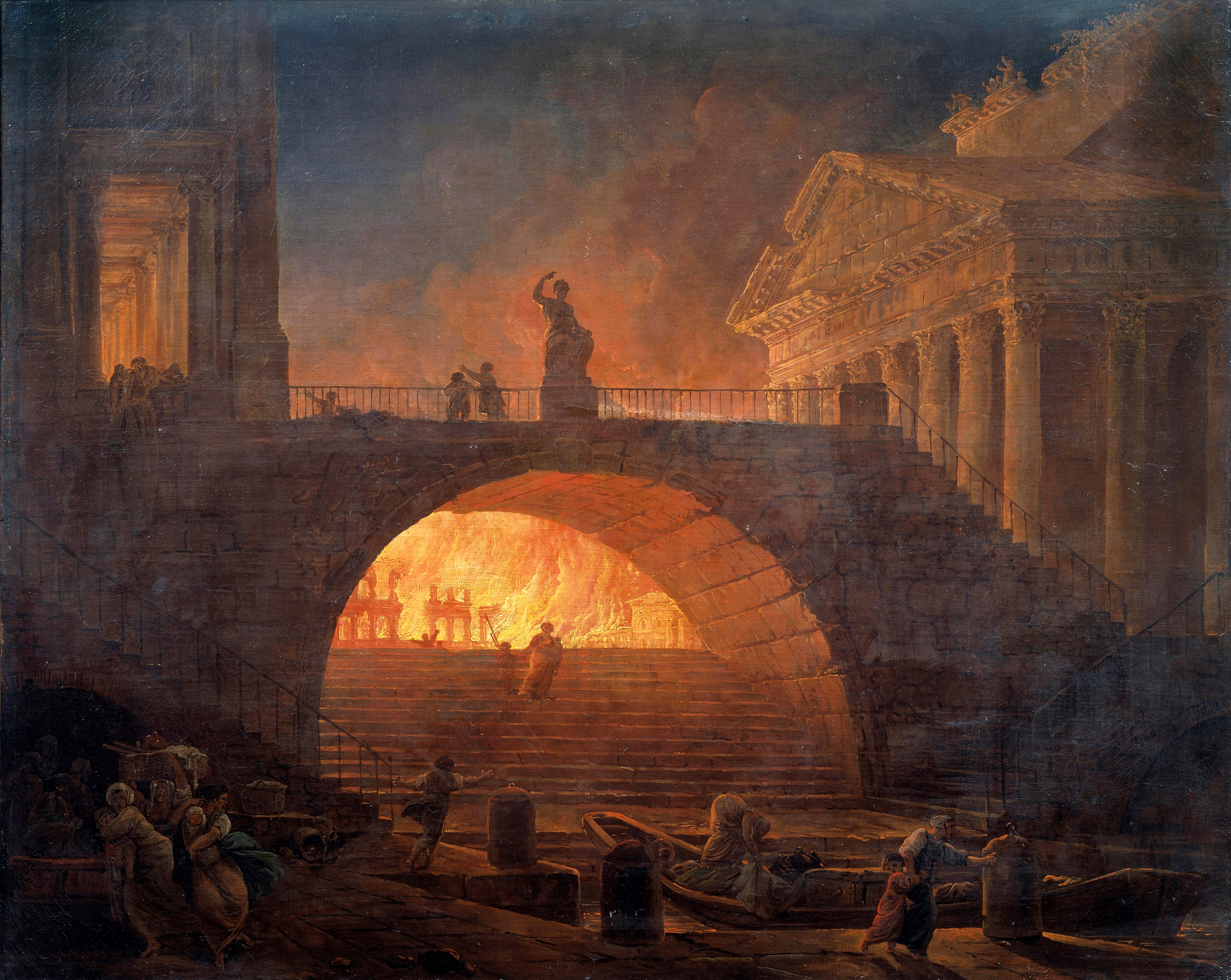
18th-century painting of the Great Fire of Rome, which saw the destruction of two-thirds of the city. The fire precipitated the empire's first persecution against Christians, who were blamed for the disaster.

The 60s decade ran from January 1, AD 60, to December 31, AD 69.

In the Roman Empire, the early part of the decade saw the beginning of the Boudican Revolt in Britannia, where several tribes (chiefly the Iceni), led by Boudica, rebelled against the Roman occupation. The revolt led to the sacking of several Roman cities, but was ultimately quelled by governor Gaius Suetonius Paulinus. In 63, the Roman–Parthian War came to an end with the Treaty of Rhandeia. In 66, the First Jewish-Roman War began, as Jewish rebels fought against Roman rule. Near the end of the decade in 69, the Year of the Four Emperors saw a period of civil war and political instability in the Roman Empire, as four different men (Galba, Otho, Vitellius, and Vespasian) claimed the title of Emperor within the span of a year. Ultimately, the year ended with the ascension of Vespasian to the throne and the beginning of the Flavian Dynasty. In East Asia, the state of Funan was established, while China continued its golden age.

In 62, an earthquake of an estimated magnitude of between 5 and 6 and a maximum intensity of IX or X on the Mercalli scale struck the towns of Pompeii and Herculaneum, severely damaging them. The towns of Pompeii and Herculaneum both suffered major damage, with damage to some buildings also reported from Naples and Nuceria. Seneca reported the death of a flock of 600 sheep that he attributed to the effects of poisonous gases. Later, in 64, the Great Fire of Rome began in the merchant shops around Rome's chariot stadium, Circus Maximus. After six days, the fire was brought under control, but before the damage could be assessed, the fire reignited and burned for another three days. In the aftermath of the fire, two-thirds of Rome had been destroyed. According to Tacitus and later Christian tradition, Emperor Nero blamed the devastation on the Christian community in the city, initiating the empire's first persecution against the Christians.

In the Roman Empire, Christianity continued to spread, despite a campaign of persecution being initiated under Emperor Nero in 64. According to tradition, the apostles Peter and Paul were both martyred during this period: Traditionally, Roman authorities allegedly sentenced Peter to death by crucifixion at Vatican Hill. In accordance with the apocryphal Acts of Peter, he was crucified head down. As for Paul, the Second Epistle to Timothy states that he was arrested in Troad and brought back to Rome, where he was imprisoned and put on trial before being executed. The White Horse Temple, the first Buddhist temple in China, was traditionally constructed in 68, though it is not recorded in contemporary sources before 289.

In 62 or 64, the Baths of Nero were constructed. It stood between the Pantheon and the Stadium of Domitian and were listed among the most notable buildings in the city by Roman authors and became a much-frequented venue. In his final years, Seneca the Younger wrote De Providentia (discussing the problem of evil), De Beneficiis (discussing the award and reception of gifts and favours within society), and compiled a collection of 124 written near the end of his life. After Seneca's death in 65, a play named Octavia was written: the Roman tragedy focuses on three days in the year 62 during which Nero divorced and exiled his wife Claudia Octavia and married another (Poppaea Sabina). The play also deals with the irascibility of Nero and his inability to take heed of the philosopher Seneca's advice to rein in his passions. The Pharsalia, a poem detailing Caesar's civil war (49–45 BC), was also written during this decade.

Manning (2008) tentatively estimates the world population in AD 60 as 249 million.

== Events ==
=== By place ===
==== Roman Empire ====
- The Roxolani are defeated on the Danube by the Romans.
- Nero's exploration of the Nile: Emperor Nero sends an expedition which reaches the historical city Meroë (Sudan). (approximate date)
- Vitellius is (possibly) proconsul of the province of Africa.
- Agrippa II of the Herodians rules the northeast of Judea.
- The city of Laodicea on the Lycus is destroyed by an earthquake
- The following events in Roman Britain (Britannia) take place in AD 60 or 61:
  - Gaius Suetonius Paulinus, Roman governor of Britain, captures the island of Mona (Anglesey), the last stronghold of the Druids.
  - Prasutagus, king of the Iceni (modern East Anglia), dies leaving a will which passes his kingdom to his two daughters and the Roman Empire. The Roman army, however, annexes the kingdom as if conquered, depriving the nobles of their hereditary lands and plundering the land. The king's widow, Boudica, is flogged and forced to watch their daughters publicly raped. Roman financiers, including Seneca the Younger, call in their loans.
  - Boudica leads a rebellion of the Iceni against Roman rule in alliance with the Trinovantes, Cornovii, Durotriges and Celtic Britons. The Iceni and Trinovantes first destroy the Roman capital Camulodunum (Colchester), wipe out the infantry of the Legio IX Hispana (commanded by Quintus Petillius Cerialis) and go on to burn Londinium (London) (probably destroying London Bridge) and Verulamium (St Albans), in all cases massacring the inhabitants by the thousands.
  - Battle of Watling Street: Paulinus defeats the rebels, using a flying wedge formation, imposes wide-ranging punishments on native Britons, and the Romanization of Britain continues. Boudica either poisons herself, or falls sick and dies.

=== By topic ===
==== Religion ====
- The First Epistle of Peter, if by Peter, is probably written between this year and c. AD 64.
- Paul of Tarsus journeys to Rome, but is shipwrecked on Malta. He stays for three months and converts Publius, the first bishop of Malta.
- Paul's Epistle to the Philippians is written from Rome. (approximate date)

==== Art and science ====
- Hero of Alexandria writes Metrica, Mechanics, and Pneumatics.
- AD 60–79 – House of the Vettii, Pompeii, is rebuilt.

=== By place ===
==== Roman Empire ====
- Publius Petronius Turpilianus and Lucius Caesennius Paetus become Roman consuls.
- Galba becomes governor of Hispania Tarraconensis.
- The following events in Roman Britain (Britannia) take place in AD 60 or 61:
  - Gaius Suetonius Paulinus, Roman governor of Britain, captures the island of Mona (Anglesey), the last stronghold of the Druids.
  - Prasutagus, king of the Iceni (modern East Anglia), dies leaving a will which passes his kingdom to his two daughters and the Roman Empire. The Roman army however annexes the kingdom as if conquered, depriving the nobles of their hereditary lands and plundering the land. The king's widow, Boudica, is flogged and forced to watch their daughters publicly raped. Roman financiers, including Seneca the Younger, call in their loans.
  - Boudica leads a rebellion of the Iceni against Roman rule in alliance with the Trinovantes, Cornovii, Durotriges and Celtic Britons. The Iceni and Trinovantes first destroy the Roman capital Camulodunum (Colchester), wipe out the infantry of the Legio IX Hispana (commanded by Quintus Petillius Cerialis) and go on to burn Londinium (London) (probably destroying London Bridge) and Verulamium (St Albans), in all cases massacring the inhabitants in their thousands.
  - Battle of Watling Street: Paulinus defeats the rebels, using a flying wedge formation, and imposes wide-ranging punishments on native Britons, but is removed from office after an enquiry instituted by Gaius Julius Alpinus Classicianus (appointed procurator 61) and the Romanisation of Britain continues. Boudica either poisons herself or falls sick and dies.

=== By place ===
==== Roman Empire ====
- Emperor Nero marries for the second time, to Poppaea Sabina, ex-wife of Marcus Salvius Otho.
- After the death of Burrus and the disgrace of Seneca, Nero is free from their influence and becomes a megalomaniacal artist fascinated by Hellenism and the Orient. Tigellinus becomes Nero's counselor. His rule is highly abusive.
- Nero completes the Baths of Nero in Rome.
- A great earthquake damages cities in Campania, including Pompeii (February 5).
- The Parthians invade Armenia and lay siege to Tigranocerta. The city is well-fortified and garrisoned by the Romans. The assault fails and king Vologases I retreats. Instead, he makes preparations to invade Syria.
- Gnaeus Domitius Corbulo strengthens the fortifications on the Euphrates frontier. He builds a strong flotilla of ships equipped with catapults and a wooden bridge across the river, which allows him to establish a foothold on the Parthian shore.
- Lucius Caesennius Paetus advances towards Tigranocerta, but due to lack of supplies he makes camp for the winter in the fortress at Rhandeia in northwestern Armenia.
- Vologases I leads the Parthian army in a full-scale assault on the Euphrates. Legio X Fretensis and men of the other two legions (Legio III Gallica and Legio VI Ferrata) defend the eastern bank of the river, fighting off a desperate attack.
- Battle of Rhandeia: The Roman army (two legions) is defeated by the Parthians under king Tiridates I. Paetus surrenders and withdraws his disheveled army to Syria.
- A violent storm destroys 200 ships anchored at Portus.

=== By topic ===
==== Arts and sciences ====
- Lucan writes a history of the conflict between Julius Caesar and Pompey.
- The making of Still Life, a detail of a wall painting from Herculaneum, begins (finished in AD 79). It is now kept at Museo Nazionale in Naples.

==== Religion ====
- Paul of Tarsus is released from imprisonment in Rome (approximate date).

=== By place ===
==== Roman Empire ====
- Vespasian becomes governor of Africa (estimated year).
- Gnaeus Domitius Corbulo is restored to command after the Roman debacle at the Battle of Rhandeia. He invades Armenia and defeats Tiridates I, who accepts Roman sovereignty. Parthia withdraws from the war.
- Pompeii, the city at the foot of Mount Vesuvius, builds a new monumental forum, after the town is heavily damaged by a strong earthquake.

=== By topic ===
==== Religion ====
- According to legend, Joseph of Arimathea goes to Glastonbury on the first Christian mission to Britain.
- Apostle Paul possibly visits Spain.

==== Arts and sciences ====
- Aulus Cornelius Celsus writes a dictionary (encyclopedia) on the arts and sciences.

=== By place ===
==== Roman Empire ====
- July 18- 27 – Great Fire of Rome: A fire begins which destroyed three of fourteen of the administrative regions of Rome, more commonly known as the Palatine Hill, the Circus Maximus, and the Oppian hill. Also suffering severe damage were the Campus Martius and the Via Lata.
- Persecution of Christians in Rome begins under Nero. Peter the Apostle is possibly among those crucified.
- Nero proposes a new urban planning program based on the creation of buildings decorated with ornate porticos, the widening of the streets and the use of open spaces. This plan will not be applied until after his death in AD 68.
- Lyon sends a large sum of money to Rome to aid in the reconstruction. However, during the winter of AD 64–65, Lyon suffers a catastrophic fire itself, and Nero reciprocates by sending money to Lyon.

==== Asia ====
- The Kushan sack the ancient town of Taxila (in modern-day Pakistan).

=== By topic ===
==== Religion ====
- First Epistle of Peter written from Babylon according to traditional Christian belief.
- Paul leaves Titus in Crete as bishop (approximate date) Then goes to Asia Minor

==== Arts and sciences ====
- Seneca proclaims the equality of all men, including slaves.

=== By place ===
==== Roman Empire ====
- April 19 – The freedman Milichus betrays the Pisonian conspiracy led by Gaius Calpurnius Piso to kill Emperor Nero and all the conspirators are arrested.
- An epidemic afflicts Rome.
- After a stage performance in which he appears and shocks the senatorial class considerably, Nero engages in a series of reprisals against Seneca the Younger and Tigellinus, pro-republican senators, and anyone else he distrusts.
- Nero's pregnant wife, Poppea Sabina, dies from Nero kicking her stomach or while having a miscarriage.

=== By topic ===
==== Religion ====
- Paul of Tarsus ordains Timothy as bishop of Ephesus (traditional date).
- Paul writes his first epistle to Timothy in Corinth; afterwards, he goes to Nikopoli to spend the winter.
- In China, the first official reference to Buddhism is made.
- The first Christian community in Africa is founded by Mark, a disciple of Peter.

=== By place ===
==== Roman Empire ====
- September 22 – Emperor Nero creates the Legio I Italica. He appoints Titus Flavius Vespasian as General of the army of Judea, and Governor of Judea which gives him command of three legions — V Macedonica, X Fretensis and XV Apollinaris.
- October – The Jewish Revolt commences against the Roman Empire. The Zealots lay siege to Jerusalem and annihilate the Roman garrison (a cohort of Legio III Cyrenaica). The Sicarii capture the fortress of Masada overlooking the Dead Sea.
- Mid–late October – Cestius Gallus, legate of Syria, marches into Judea and leads a Roman army of 30,000 men to put down the Jewish rebellion. At its core is Legio XII Fulminata, plus 2,000 selected men from the other three Syrian legions, six more cohorts of infantry and four alae of cavalry, plus over 14,000 auxiliaries furnished by Rome's eastern allies, including Herod Agrippa II and two other client kings, Antiochus IV of Commagene and Sohaemus of Emesa, who lead their forces (largely archers and cavalry) in person.
- Gallus leads his main force down the coast from Caesarea via Antipatris to Lydda, detaching other units, by land and sea, to neutralize the rebel strongholds at Joppa, Narbata and the Tower of Aphek. With Galilee and the entire Judean coast in his hands, Gallus assumes his campaign before the winter rains render the roads impassable. He turns inland and marches on Jerusalem, taking the road via the plain at Emmaus. Gallus succeeds in conquering Beit She'arim (the "New City") on the Bezetha Hill.
- November – Battle of Beth-Horon: Gallus abandons the siege of Jerusalem and chooses, for uncertain reasons, to withdraw west to winter quarters, where he is ambushed and defeated by Judean rebels. Some 5,300 Roman troops are killed, as well as all their pack animals, their artillery (which is to serve the Jews of Jerusalem during Titus's siege operations four years later), and the greatest disgrace of all, the eagle standard of Legio XII Fulminata. Gallus abandons his troops in disarray, fleeing to Syria.

==== Britannia ====
- Suetonius Paullinus, governor of Britannia, becomes a Roman Consul.
- The Roman Legio II Augusta is stationed at Gloucester.

==== Asia ====
- Baekje invades Silla in the Korean Peninsula, and captures Castle Ugok.

=== By topic ===
==== Arts and sciences ====
- Dioscorides writes his De Materia Medica, a treatise on the methodical treatment of disease by use of medicine (approximate date).

==== Astronomy ====
- Halley's Comet is visible.

==== Religion ====
- The first and second Epistles to Timothy are written (speculative date, if actually written by St. Paul).
- Paul in Asia Minor for second time after his release from Rome. Then probably goes to Greece. Second imprisonment in Rome.

=== By place ===
==== Roman Empire ====
- Gaius Julius Vindex revolts, first in a series of revolts that lead to Nero's downfall.
- Gaius Licinius Mucianus replaces Gaius Cestius Gallus as governor of Syria.
- First Jewish–Roman War: Vespasian arrives in Ptolemais in Phoenicia along with the Legio X Fretensis and Legio V Macedonica, to put down the revolt.
- Vespasian is joined by his son Titus, who brings Legio XV Apollinaris from Alexandria. By late spring the Roman army numbers more than 60,000 soldiers, including auxilia and troops of King Herod Agrippa II.
- Jewish leaders at Jerusalem are divided through a power struggle, and a brutal civil war erupts. The Zealots and the Sicarii execute anyone who tries to leave the city.
- Siege of Yodfat: Its 40,000 Jewish inhabitants are massacred. The historian Josephus, leader of the rebels in Galilee, is captured by the Romans. Vespasian is wounded in the foot by an arrow fired from the city wall.
- The Jewish fortress of Gamla in the Golan falls to the Romans, and its inhabitants are massacred.
- Nero travels to Greece, where he participates in the Olympic Games and other festivals.
- Nero, jealous of the success of Gnaeus Domitius Corbulo in Armenia, orders that he be put to death. Corbulo literally "falls on his sword".

=== By topic ===
==== Religion ====
- Apostles Peter and Paul are martyred in Rome (possible date).
- Linus succeeds Peter, as the second Bishop of Rome.

=== By place ===
==== Roman Empire ====
- Final year that Tacitus records Annals, a written history of the Roman Empire.
- Lucius Clodius Macer revolts against the reign of Nero.
- The Senate declares Nero as persona non grata.
- June 9 – Emperor Nero commits suicide four miles outside Rome. He is deserted by the Praetorian Guard, and then stabs himself in the throat.
- June 9 – The Roman Senate accepts Servius Sulpicius Galba, as Roman Emperor.
- Legio I Macriana liberatrix and Legio I Adiutrix are created.
- Marcus Ulpius Trajanus, father of Trajan, becomes consul.
- Trajan moves to Scythopolis and crosses the Jordan River with Legio X Fretensis. He lays siege to Jericho and destroys the monastery of Qumran, where the Dead Sea Scrolls are originated.
- Winter – Titus sets up camp at Jericho and the Romans cut off escape routes toward Jerusalem.
- Venutius successfully deposes his wife Cartimandua and becomes the ruler of the Brigantes.

==== Asia ====
- Kingdom of Funan is established in the Mekong Delta comprising present-day Cambodia, Southern Vietnam, Southern Thailand and Eastern Thailand, the first known civilization in Southeast Asia. The capital city is Vyadhapura or modern-day Ba Phnum District in Cambodia.
- King Dodu of Galsa Buyeo offered the country to Taejodae of Goguryeo, Galsa Buyeo was destroyed by Goguryeo.

=== By topic ===
==== Religion ====
- Buddhism officially arrives in China with the building of the White Horse Temple.
- Apostles Peter and Paul are martyred in Rome (latest possible date).
- Ignatius of Antioch becomes the third bishop of Antioch.
- The Essenes place the Dead Sea Scrolls in the caves at Qumran.

=== By place ===
==== Roman Empire ====
- The Year of the Four Emperors: After Nero's death, Galba, Otho, Vitellius and Vespasian succeed each other as emperor during the year. The year is marked by numerous instances of a breakdown in discipline and mutinous conduct amongst the Roman legions and the praetorian guard.
- January 1 – The Roman legions in Germania Superior refuse to swear loyalty to Galba. They rebel and proclaim Vitellius as emperor.
- January 10 – Lucius Calpurnius Piso Licinianus is adopted by Galba and appointed to deputy Roman Emperor.
- January 15 – Galba and his adopted son Piso are murdered by the Praetorian Guard on the Roman Forum.
- Otho seizes power in Rome, proclaims himself emperor, and reigns for three months before committing suicide.
- Marcus Trebellius Maximus, governor of Britannia, is forced to flee to Gaul after a mutiny of Legio XX Valeria Victrix at Deva Victrix (Chester).
- April 14 – First Battle of Bedriacum: Vitellius defeats Otho's legions; Otho commits suicide.
- April 17 – After the First Battle of Bedriacum, Vitellius becomes emperor.
- Marcus Vettius Bolanus becomes the new governor of Britain and faces a second insurrection of Venutius, king of the Brigantes.
- July 1 – two legions in Egypt, a legion in Syria, and a legion in Judea declare Vespasian emperor
- July 1 – Tiberius Julius Alexander orders his legions in Alexandria to swear allegiance to Vespasian as emperor.
- July 3 – The army of Judea swears allegiance to Vespasian as emperor.
- August 1 – Batavian rebellion: The Batavians in Germania Inferior (Netherlands) revolt under the leadership of Gaius Julius Civilis.
- German warbands cross over to join the revolt and attack the fortress at Mainz.
- The Batavians attack Roman forts on the Rhine frontier; Fectio and Traiectum (modern Utrecht) are destroyed.
- In Gallia Belgica, cohors II Tungrorum, raised from the inhabitants of Atuatuca Tungrorum in the north-west of the Ardennes Forest, revolt against the Romans.
- The Danubian legions of Raetia and Moesia proclaim Vespasian as emperor.
- October 24 – Second Battle of Bedriacum: Flavians under Antonius Primus defeat the Vitellians.
- December 22 – Vitellius is captured and murdered by the Gemonian stairs. Vespasian becomes emperor.
- Judea: The Jewish Revolt – Vespasian lays siege to Jerusalem; the city is captured the following year by his son Titus.
- Josephus, Jewish rebel leader, is dragged before Vespasian and becomes his historian (he "prophesied" him his elevation to the purple).
- Legio I Macriana liberatrix is disbanded.
- The Flavian dynasty starts.

==== China ====
Liumao/Liumiao, the sovereign of the Ailao, led a group of his people, some estimate more than 500 000, to submit to the Han Emperor. The Ailao occupied the upper regions of the Irrawaddy River basin in what is now known as northern Myanmar and China's southwest Yunnan province.

The first recorded crossing of the Qingshuilang Shan (清水郎山) mountains near Yongping, west of Kunming by Chinese explorers.

== Demographics ==
Due to lack of reliable demographic data, estimates of the world population in the 1st century vary wildly, with estimates for AD 1 varying from 150 to 300 million. Demographers typically do not attempt to estimate most specific years in antiquity, instead giving approximate numbers for round years such as AD 1 or AD 200. However, attempts at reconstructing the world population in more specific years have been made, with Manning (2008) tentatively estimating the world population in AD 60 as 249 million.

== Significant people ==
- Boudicca, rebellious British queen
- Gaius Suetonius Paulinus, Roman general
- Julius Civilis, leader of the Batavian rebellion against the Romans

== Births ==
AD 60

- Buddhamitra, Indian Buddhist nun (approximate date)
- Marcus Vitorius Marcellus, Roman politician (approximate date)
- Nicomachus, Greek mathematician (approximate date)

AD 61

- Pliny the Younger, Roman author and statesman (d. c. 113)

AD 63

- Dou, Chinese empress of the Han Dynasty (d. AD 97)

AD 64

- September 13 – Julia Flavia, daughter of Titus and lover of his brother Domitian (d. AD 96)
- Julia Agricola, daughter of Gnaeus Julius Agricola
- Philo of Byblos, Phoenician historian and writer (d. 141)

AD 65

- Philopappos, Greek prince of Commagene (d. AD 116)
- Tiberius Claudius Atticus Herodes, Greek aristocrat

AD 67

- Myeongnim Dap-bu, Korean prime minister (d. 179)
- Publius Juventius Celsus, Roman consul (d. 130)

AD 68

- July 4 – Salonia Matidia, niece of Trajan (d. AD 119)
- Flavius Scorpus, Roman charioteer (approximate date)
- Gaius Bruttius Praesens, Roman consul (d. AD 140)

AD 69

- Gaius Suetonius Tranquillus, Roman historian (approximate date)
- Polycarpus, bishop and martyr of Smyrna (d. AD 155)

== Deaths ==
AD 60

- Abdagases I, king of the Parthian Empire (approximate date)
- Boudica, British queen of the Iceni tribe (approximate date)
- Peter of Rates, first bishop of Braga (approximate date)

AD 61

- Barnabas, Cypriot Jew and bishop of Milan (approximate date)
- Boudica, British queen of the Iceni tribe (approximate date)
- Lucius Pedanius Secundus, Roman politician and prefect
- Ma Wu, Chinese general of the Eastern Han Dynasty
- Publius Memmius Regulus, Roman politician

AD 62

- June 8 – Claudia Octavia, wife of Nero (possibly executed) (b. AD 40)
- November 24 – Aulus Persius Flaccus, Roman poet (b. AD 34)
- Faustus Cornelius Sulla Felix, Roman consul (murdered) (b. AD 22)
- Gaius Rubellius Plautus, cousin of Nero (executed) (b. AD 33)
- James the Just, brother of Jesus (martyred) (approximate date)
- Lucius Caecilius Iucundus, Roman banker from Pompeii (b. c. AD 14)
- Sextus Afranius Burrus, Roman prefect and friend of Seneca (b. AD 1)

AD 63

- Claudia Augusta, daughter of Nero
- Mark the Evangelist (traditional date) (see AD 61)

AD 64

- October 13 — Peter the Apostle (Margherita Guarducci, who led the research leading to the rediscovery of Peter's reputed tomb in 1963, concluded that Peter died on that date, shortly after the Great Fire of Rome and during the festivities to mark "dies imperii" of Emperor Nero, and that Peter and other Christians were crucified in honor of the decennial of Nero's October 13, AD 54 ascension to the imperial throne.) (b. 1 BC)
- Decimus Junius Silanus Torquatus, Roman consul (b. AD 16)
- Paul the Apostle (earliest date) (b. AD 5)
- Yin Lihua, Chinese empress (b. AD 5)

AD 65

- April 30 – Lucan, Roman poet and philosopher (b. AD 39)
- Faenius Rufus, Roman praetorian prefect (executed)
- Gaius Calpurnius Piso, Roman consul (approximate date)
- Gaius Julius Alpinus Classicianus, Roman procurator
- Jude the Apostle, Christian martyr (approximate date)
- Lucius Antistius Vetus, Roman consul and governor
- Lucius Junius Gallio Annaeanus, Roman politician
- Marcus Julius Vestinus Atticus, Roman politician
- Marcus Ostorius Scapula, Roman politician
- Plautius Lateranus, Roman politician (executed)
- Poppea Sabina, second wife of Nero (b. AD 30)
- Seneca, Roman statesman and tutor of Nero (b. AD 1)
- Simon the Zealot, Christian martyr (approximate date)

AD 66

- Claudia Antonia, daughter of Claudius (b. AD 30)
- Gaius Anicius Cerialis, Roman suffect consul
- Gaius Petronius Arbiter, Roman politician (b. AD 27)
- Lucius Annius Vinicianus, Roman politician (b. AD 36)
- Marcia Servilia Sorana, Roman noblewoman
- Rufrius Crispinus, Roman praetorian prefect

AD 67

- Publius Anteius Rufus, Roman politician
- Cestius Gallus, Roman politician and governor
- Gnaeus Domitius Corbulo, Roman general (b. c. AD 7)
- Lucius Domitius Paris, Roman freedman and actor
- Paul the Apostle, Christian martyr (b. c. AD 5)
- Paulinus of Antioch, Roman bishop and martyr
- Publius Sulpicius Scribonius, Roman politician

AD 68

- April 25 – Mark the Evangelist, pope of Alexandria
- June 9 – Nero, Roman emperor (suicide) (b. AD 37)
- Ananus ben Ananus, Jewish high priest of Israel
- Basilissa and Anastasia, Christian martyrs (beheaded)
- Gaius Julius Vindex, Roman governor (suicide)
- Lucius Clodius Macer, Roman general (murdered)
- Nymphidius Sabinus, Roman praetorian prefect
- Onesimus, bishop of Byzantium (approximate date)
- Publius Petronius Turpilianus, Roman consul (suicide)
- Tiberius Julius Mithridates, Roman client king

AD 69

- January 15
  - Cornelius Laco, Roman praetorian prefect (murdered)
  - Sempronius Densus, Roman bodyguard (killed)
  - Lucius Calpurnius Piso Licinianus, Roman deputy emperor (b. AD 38)
  - Servius Sulpicius Galba, Roman emperor (b. 3 BC)
- April 16 – Marcus Salvius Otho, Roman emperor (b. AD 32)
- December 20 – Titus Flavius Sabinus, Roman consul (murdered)
- December 22 – Aulus Vitellius Germanicus, Roman emperor (b. AD 15)
- Cartimandua, Queen of the Brigantes (approximate date)
- Gaius Ofonius Tigellinus, Roman praetorian prefect (suicide)
- Locusta, Roman female poison expert to Nero (executed)
- Lucius Vitellius (the Younger), Roman politician (executed)
- Marcus Hordeonius Flaccus, Roman politician (murdered)
- Titus Flavius Sabinus, brother of Vespasian
- Sextilia, mother of Aulus Vitellius and Lucius Vitellius (suicide)
- Sporus, Roman freedman and male lover of Nero (suicide)
- Titus Vinius, Roman general and consul (b. AD 12)
