= Nero (2004 film) =

- Directed by: Paul Marcus
- Starring: Hans Matheson; Laura Morante; John Simm; Matthias Habich
- Theme music composer: Andrea Guerra
- Countries of origin: United Kingdom; Italy; Spain
- Original language: English

Production
- Running time: 197 min

Original release
- Release: 2004

Nero is an Italian-British-Spanish television TV series, part of the Imperium series; it was made available on DVD as of November 2005 in the U.S. and Canada. Produced by EOS Entertainment and Lux Vide for RAI and Telecinco.

== Plot ==
As a young boy, Lucius Domitius Ahenobarbus witnesses the mad Emperor Caligula kill his father and exile his mother. While in exile in the Pontine Islands, Agrippina, his mother, sees a vision telling her that her son can become emperor, but she will have to die first. She accepts the proposal. Back in Rome, her son is being raised by the new emperor Claudius after Caligula's death, he is now called Nero Claudius Caesar Drusus Germanicus. Agrippina then returns from exile. She poisons Claudius' food and Nero becomes emperor. At first, Nero cuts taxes and introduces successful programs and invades Brittania. Soon he announced his wish to marry, Claudia Acte, a former slave whom he has known since youth. To do this, he divorces Claudius' daughter, Claudia Octavia, telling her she can marry someone she will be happy with. Heartbroken, she arrives at an island and kills herself. Octavia's brother Brittanicus in anger wishes for Nero and Acte to be dead; this act, along the knowledge the young man can be used by his opponents, drives Nero to assasinate him. Shocked by his action, Acte separates with him. Unable to reconcile with her, Nero gradually goes mad with power and kills several members of the senate, as well as orders his mother to be stabbed, where she says: "Strike the womb, for that is what bore him." It is implied (though not confirmed) he arranges the Great Fire of Rome to rebuilt city according to his vision.Nero also forces the citizens to watch hour long recitals, and at one of these, his new pregnant wife, Poppaea Sabina, dies after collapsing during the dance with him. Nero's madness eventually soon causes a riot, causing himself to flee the city in disguise, and slit his wrists under the saddened embrace of Claudia Acte, his once passionate lover.

The movie in many ways tries to show Nero as a good soul gone mad, beginning as a brilliant young prince enduring injustice, then hailed enthusiastically at the beginning of his reign, implementing much-needed reforms and enjoying immense popularity. Half the film concentrates on Nero's teenage years and his love life with Acte.

== Historical flaws ==
His relationship with Claudia Acte is altered, and its influence on his divorce from Claudia Octavia exaggerated. In fact after Nero's divorce from Octavia he married his pregnant mistress Poppaea Sabina who had married twice before marrying Nero (Rufrius Crispinus and the future Emperor Otho). Poppaea Sabina's death is portrayed differently than how it reportedly occurred. According to the historical sources, she was kicked to death by Nero in a vicious rage. The film also omits Nero's other reported attempts to kill his mother Agrippina the Younger, first by poisoning. In his second attempt he had his mother's mattress fixed so that when she lay down, a decoration on the ceiling would fall onto the bed. A third attempt involved sabotaging a ship Agrippina was traveling on, but she managed to swim to shore. The fourth attempt, in which a soldier killed her on the spot, is shown in the movie as Agrippina walks toward the soldier and tells him, "Strike the womb that bore him". In the film Nero is shown to have a fixation on playing the harp, which is only partly true. In a late part of the movie Nero is shown playing his harp in the center of a Roman Theatre as Emperor around 62 A.D. This is fiction, because Nero never played his harp in front of a large audience. He usually played it in isolation or within a small group of friends.

At the end, Nero escapes from the city by himself and slits his wrists where he is embraced by Acte. In reality, Nero escaped from the city in disguise to the house of one of his loyal freedmen; there he committed suicide by stabbing himself in the neck. However, he botched the job and had to have a slave finish him act off for him.

The Emperor Caligula is also altered. In the film, Caligula banishes Agrippina, Nero's mother, as he did in reality, but in reality, both Agrippina and Julia Livilla were exiled, yet Livilla is not even mentioned in the film. The assassination of Caligula is also depicted inaccurately. In the film, Caligula is lured to a brothel by his attendants, where he is assassinated. Historically, he was killed in a cryptoporticus underneath a Palatine Hill theater by praetorian guards led by Cassius Chaerea, Marcus Vinicius, and Lucius Annius Vinicianus. After Caligula was murdered, his wife and daughter were eliminated.

The film's budget was around €800,000. It was filmed on location in Sicily and Tunisia in late 2004 and early 2005.

== Cast ==
- Hans Matheson - Nero
- Laura Morante - Agrippina
- Rike Schmid - Acte
- Simón Andreu - Porridus
- Sonia Aquino - Messalina
- Maria Gabriella Barbuti - Licia
- James Bentley - Young Nero
- Marco Bonini - Rufus
- Robert Brazil - Gaius Silius
- Philippe Caroit - Apollonius
- Todd Carter - Senator # 1
- Massimo Dapporto - Claudius
- Maurizio Donadoni - Burrus
- Emanuela Garuccio - Claudia
- Matthias Habich - Seneca
- Klaus Händl - Pallas
- Jochen Horst - Etius
- Ruby Kammer - Marzia
- Ángela Molina - Domitia
- Mario Opinato - Tigellinus
- Vittoria Puccini - Octavia
- Ian Richardson - Septimus
- Paolo Scalabrino - Senator # 2
- John Simm - Caligula
- Liz Smith - Soothsayer
- Elisa Tovati - Poppea
- Pierre Vaneck - Paul of Tarsus
- Francesco Venditti - Britannicus

== Crew ==
- Directed by: Paul Marcus
- Teleplay by: Paul Billing & Francesco Contaldo
- Produced by: Luca Bernabei
- Director of Photography: Giovanni Galasso
- Production Designer: Paolo Biagetti
- Edited by: Alessandro Lucidi
- Costume Designer: Paolo Scalabrino
- Music By: Andrea Guerra

== See also ==
- List of historical drama films
- List of films set in ancient Rome
