= Nymphidia gens =

Ancient Roman family

The gens Nymphidia was a plebeian family at ancient Rome. Members of this gens are not mentioned until imperial times, and none of them are known to have obtained any of the higher offices of the Roman state, although one of them, Gaius Nymphidius Sabinus, attempted to seize the throne following the death of the emperor Nero.

== Praenomina ==
As with other families of imperial times, the Nymphidii known to history used only a few praenomina, Gaius and Publius occurring in ancient writers and inscriptions. Tryphon, a Greek name appearing in the name of Tryphon Nymphidius Philocalus, was never a praenomen, although he may have used it in place of one; although unusual, it was not unheard of for freedmen to continue using their original names in place of praenomina, even after obtaining Roman nomina. Since the inscription mentioning him suggests that he was wealthy, it also seems possible that Tryphon was part of a longer name, perhaps the surname of one of his ancestors.

== Origin ==
The nomen Nymphidius is clearly not of Roman origin, being derived from the Greek name Nymphis, presumably borne by an ancestor of the Nymphidii. The nomen falls within a class of gentilicia formed using the suffix -idius, although in this case because the stem of Nymphis is Nymphid-, rather than because it ended in -idus.

== Branches and cognomina ==
There is no evidence that the Nymphidii were ever divided into distinct branches, but several surnames appear among those members of the family found in ancient writers and inscriptions. Sabinus, belonging to the most famous of the Nymphidii, and probably one of the earliest, refers to a Sabine, suggesting another possible origin for the gens; Lupus means "wolf", Valens means "strong" or "powerful". Ogulnianus signifies that its bearer was either adopted from the Ogulnia gens into some family of the Nymphidii, or that he was descended from the Ogulnii through the female line; Fuscanius appears to be a nomen gentilicium built on the cognomen Fuscus, "dark", and probably entered the family through the female line. Chresimus and Philocalus are Greek names, and probably belonged to freedmen of the Nymphidia gens, who may have passed them to their descendants as surnames.

== Members ==
This list includes abbreviated praenomina. For an explanation of this practice, see filiation.

- Nymphidia, the daughter of Gaius Julius Callistus, was a courtesan at the imperial court in the time of Caligula. She was the mother of Gaius Nymphidius Sabinus.
- Gaius Nymphidius Sabinus, one of the commanders of the Praetorian Guard during the reign of Nero. He helped suppress the Pisonian conspiracy in AD 66, and was rewarded with the consular insignia. After Nero's death, Nymphidius, claiming to be the son of Caligula, hoped to succeed the late emperor, but he was killed by the associates of Galba.
- Nymphidius Lupus, a friend of Pliny the Younger, with whom he had served in the Roman army. He was the primus pilus, or senior centurion, of his legion. Pliny recommended Nymphidius' son to the emperor Trajan.
- Gaius Nymphidius Chresimus, listed in a century of soldiers stationed at Rome in AD 70.
- Nymphidius Lupus, son of Pliny's friend, was prefect of his cohort, in a legion commanded by Julius Ferox and Fuscus Salinator.
- Nymphidius, presented a question to the jurist Julius Paulus, to which Paulus' answer appears in the Digest.
- Tryphon Nymphidius Philocalus, the patron of Gaius Messius Eunomius Senior, buried at Rome, aged ninety.
- Nymphidia, the daughter of Nymphidius, buried at Rome, aged two years, five months.
- Publius Nymphidius P. f. Fuscanius, a veteran of the fourth cohort, buried at Ostia with his wife, Cornelia Felis.
- Nymphidia, the mother of Publius Nymphidius Valens.
- Publius Nymphidius P. f. Valens, a member of the council of Nicopolis ad Istrum in Moesia Inferior, where he was buried, aged thirty.
- Gaius Nymphidius Ogulnianus, together with Gaius Annius Proculus, erected a monument to their mother, Julia Apollonia, at Portus in Latium.

== See also ==
- List of Roman gentes

== Bibliography ==
- Gaius Plinius Caecilius Secundus (Pliny the Younger), Epistulae (Letters).
- Publius Cornelius Tacitus, Annales, Historiae
- Plutarchus, Lives of the Noble Greeks and Romans.
- Digesta seu Pandectae (The Digest).
- Dictionary of Greek and Roman Biography and Mythology, William Smith, ed., Little, Brown and Company, Boston (1849).
- Theodor Mommsen et alii, Corpus Inscriptionum Latinarum (The Body of Latin Inscriptions, abbreviated CIL), Berlin-Brandenburgische Akademie der Wissenschaften (1853–present).
- René Cagnat et alii, L'Année épigraphique (The Year in Epigraphy, abbreviated AE), Presses Universitaires de France (1888–present).
- George Davis Chase, "The Origin of Roman Praenomina", in Harvard Studies in Classical Philology, vol. VIII (1897).
- Paul von Rohden, Elimar Klebs, & Hermann Dessau, Prosopographia Imperii Romani (The Prosopography of the Roman Empire, abbreviated PIR), Berlin (1898).
- Hilding Thylander, Inscriptions du port d'Ostie (Inscriptions from the Port of Ostia, abbreviated IPOstie), Acta Instituti Romani Regni Sueciae, Lund (1952).
- John C. Traupman, The New College Latin & English Dictionary, Bantam Books, New York (1995).
