= Pallas (freedman) =

Roman Secretary of Treasury and Greek freedman

Marcus Antonius Pallas
- Born: c. AD 1
- Died: AD 62 (executed)
- Occupations: Roman Secretary of Treasury (A rationibus); Chief Estate Manage of Antonii and Imperial estates
- Years active: Caligua (37-41); Claudius (41-54); Nero (54-68) until dismissed in 55

Marcus Antonius Pallas (Greek: Πάλλας; died AD 62) was a prominent Greek freedman and Secretary of the Treasury during the reigns of the Roman Emperors Claudius and Nero. He served the household of Antonia Minor. His younger brother was Marcus Antonius Felix, a procurator of Judaea Province.

== Household of Antonia Minor ==
Antonia the Younger (Antonia Minor), daughter of Mark Antony and Octavia Minor and niece of the emperor Augustus, was one of the most prominent and wealthy women of the early Roman Empire. Through her family connections and imperial favor, she possessed extensive estates, including large numbers of slaves and freedmen who operated within patron-client relationships.

Pallas was part of the Household of Antonia Minor, originally enslaved and later freed by Antonia, served as her principal financial administrator, overseeing her estates and managing her assets in Asia, Greece, Syria, Judea and Egypt. According to Tacitus, Pallas and his brother Felix claimed descent from the kings of Arcadia.

=== Emperor Tiberius ===
==== Sejanus Plot ====
In AD 31, Antonia Minor discovered that the Praetorian Prefect Sejanus was plotting to overthrow Emperor Tiberius. She entrusted Pallas to deliver the evidence to the emperor at Capri. Josephus mentions him as the slave sent by Antonia to deliver evidence to the emperor Tiberius concerning the murder of his son Drusus Julius Caesar by Sejanus.

==== Manumitted as Freedman ====
Antonia Minor probably manumitted Pallas (aged c. 30) between the years of 31 and 37, when he would have passed the minimum age for freedom. In accordance with Roman custom, Pallas took the name of her father when freed. In ancient Rome, the typical minimum age for an enslaved person to be manumitted (freed) was 30 years old, a rule established by law (Lex Aelia Sentia), though exceptions existed, especially for imperial slaves, and younger ages (like 20) were possible with special council approval for specific reasons (e.g., blood relation).

When Pallas was manumitted (freed) by Antonia Minor, he became a Roman citizen, but of the specific class known as libertini (freedmen). Despite his Roman citizenship, Pallas carried the macula servitutis (stain of slavery). This meant he was legally barred from holding public office (honores) or entering the Senatorial Order. Because he was not born into a patrician family, he was technically a plebeian. In the Roman "class system," almost all freedmen were categorized as plebeians upon gaining citizenship. While legally a "commoner," Pallas's actual power was immense because he was a member of the Antonii-household and later the Imperial Household (familia Caesaris).

=== Emperor Gaius "Caligula" ===
On 16 March 37 AD, the Death of Emperor Tiberius saw Caligula (r. 37–41) become the new emperor. He was the grandson of Antonia Minor.

On 1 May 37 AD, the death of Antonia Minor (aged 72) saw her son Claudius inherited her estates and household members. In accordance with tradition, he became the master and patron (pater familias) of all the clients belonging to the Antonii-family, with Pallas becoming his client.

Pallas accumulated wealth and is listed as owning land in Egypt during that period, possibly as a reward for his servitude. Unfortunately, our sources for this period are limited as Tacitus's books on the reign of Caligula are lost.

On 21 January 41 AD, the Assassination of Caligula led to the dramatic installation of Claudius as the new emperor, making Pallas a central figure running his masters estates and finances, and establishing a centralized imperial buraucracy.

== Imperial Court ==
=== Emperor Claudius ===
During the reign of Emperor Claudius (r. 41–54), the Imperial Court was heavily centralized with Greek freedmen running the bureaucracy, reducing the power of the Senate. At the head of this bureaucracy was Pallas as the Sectretary of Treasury (A rationibus) controlling the fiscus, Narcissus who was the Secretary of the Correspondence (Ab epistulis) and Callistus as the Secretary of Petitions (A libellis). While ancient historians like Tacitus and Suetonius portrayed Claudius as a "pawn" of his former slaves, he used them to build a highly efficient, centralized government that functioned independently of the Senate.

==== Secretary of the Treasury (A rationibus) ====
As a freedman, Pallas rose to great heights in the imperial government. From the beginning of Claudius' reign, the Senate was openly hostile to him, which forced him to centralize power. The daily maintenance of the empire was too much for one man, so Claudius divided it up among his trusted freedmen. Pallas was made secretary of the treasury (A rationibus). He did this job with such efficiency that Cornelius Scipio proposed before the Senate that he be rewarded. The position apparently enabled Pallas to reward himself as well, and was rewarded by the Senate of 15 million sesterces; he is cited by Tacitus to have a personal fortune of 300 million sesterces as he is later listed as one of the richest men of the time by Pliny the Elder. Historians acknowledge that he never embezzled directly from the imperial account, and his wealth may have come from his financial acumen. Some ancient historians claim he was able to control the emperor through his high-ranking position, but this is probably not the case. This is shown when he could not prevent his fellow freedman-administrator Polybius from being executed for treason.

==== Agrippina the Younger ====
In the second half of Claudius' reign, Pallas chose to support Agrippina the Younger as the new empress after the fall of Empress Messalina. Tacitus notes his intent to reunite the Julian and Claudian families through the marriage, and prevent either a future husband of Agrippina, or Agrippina herself, from claiming the throne. But the ancient authors also state that the real reason for his choice was that Pallas and Agrippina were lovers.

Modern historians suggest that their relationship was strictly business, and they helped each other with mutual goals. Pallas' influence on Agrippina was real and became well-known, but he continued to advise Claudius on matters of state. He was the source of a law that stated that a free woman who married a slave would remain free if the master approved.

==== Ornamenta praetoria ====
In AD 52, Pallas received a unique distinction that blurred the lines of his plebeian/freedman status. On the recommendation of Claudius, the Senate voted him the ornamenta praetoria (Praetorian Insignia). The Senate also offered him 15 million sesterces, but he (already one of the wealthiest men of the Roman Empire) refused the money and received public commemoration for virtue and frugality. He was granted the decorations and symbols of a praetor (a high-ranking magistrate), and could wear the toga of a praetor and sit in the seats reserved for them at public games, but was still not an actual Praetor due to his background.

==== Imperial Province of Judea ====
Pallas was the chief estate manager for the imperial family, managing the private estates of the family and the imperial estates of the emperor. He was deeply connected to the Hasmonean branch of the Herodian Dynasty, with Marcus Julius Agrippa I, part of the Household of Antonia Minor, as a close allied to the Antonii family and kingmaker behind Claudius.

In AD 44, Agrippa I died and the kingdom reversed back as an imperial estate of the imperial household, ultimately managed by Pallas.

In AD 52, Pallas as the treasurer and head of the imperial estates had his brother Marcus Antonius Felix selected as the Procurator of the Imperial Province of Judea (c. 52-58/60). Josephus (Antiquities 20.8.5) explicitly states that Felix received the appointment because of the influence and petition of his brother, Pallas. This was scandalous to some, Tacitus famously (and bitterly) wrote, Felix "exercised the power of a king with the mind of a slave."

=== Emperor Nero ===
On 13 October 54, Nero (r. 13 October 54 – 9 June 68) succeeded Claudius as the new emperor. Pallas stood on the right side of the imperial rivalries as "kingmaker" for Agrippina the Younger and her son Nero (aged 16). It would temporarily appear that Agrippina and Pallas were the major forces behind the young emperor.

According to Tacitus, secretary of correspondence Tiberius Claudius Narcissus, another powerful freedman at the imperial court, found himself on the losing side of the rivalries. He had hoped to bring down Agrippina by revealing her alleged affair with Pallas, which would also have undermined the position of her son Nero. Narcissus had allied himself with Britannicus, Nero's principal competitor for the succession. Narcissus was arrested and executed.

Pallas retained his position in the treasury for a time. It has been suggested (rumored) that he assisted Agrippina in murdering Claudius since he was sure of his future security, but this security did not last long and backfired. The relationship between Agrippina and her son became disastrous.

==== Fall from power ====
In AD 55, there was a shift in power from a regency of Agrippina to the autocracy of Nero (17). The year began with Nero falling in love with Claudia Acte and come in conflict with his mother - causing a constitutional crisis. In spring 55, Nero dismissed Pallas from service as A rationibus, tired of having to deal with any allies of his mother Agrippina the Younger. She became more vocal about Britannicus who was executed in February 55. The successors to the office of A Rationibus become unclear at this point, but may have been controlled by the freedman Phaon who was a close loyalist to Nero. The fiscal discipline Pallas had secured between AD 41-55 had made the imperial treasury secure, but stood in the way of the immense spending that would ensure between AD 55 to 68. Pallas as a "fiscal break" was gone and spending gradually increased. Tacitus (Annals 13.14-15) states Nero dismissed Pallas in AD 55 specifically to spite his mother, Agrippina. He records Nero's sarcastic joke that Pallas was "going to swear himself out of office," implying a total fall from grace. Despite his dismissal, Pallas would remain a formidable figure in the Roman legal and social hierarchy with a vast network influence.

==== Accused of Conspiracy ====
In AD 55, there were rumors of conspiracy to overthrow Nero and place Faustus Sulla Felix, the husband of Claudius' daughter Claudia Antonia, on the throne. The imperial freedman Pallas and the Praetorian prefect Sextus Afranius Burrus were accused by Paetus of conspiring to have Sulla declared emperor. The conspirators were put on trial, but Sulla Felix does not appear to have been implicated. Nero, however, began to watch his brother-in-law closely, afraid of his connection to the imperial family. Seneca, who was prominent in Nero's circle, came to Pallas' defense at the trial and facilitated his acquittal.

==== Fall of Agrippina ====
On 23 March AD 59, Nero had his mother Agrippina the Younger executed. Pallas had been one of her closest allies at the Imperial Court.

==== Trial of Felix ====
In 60 (or 58 in "low chronology"), his brother Procurator Marcus Antonius Felix of Judea was recalled to Rome. He faced a formal prosecution by an embassy of Jewish leaders from Caesarea. They accused him of extreme cruelty and administrative corruption—charges that would usually end a career (or a life). Apparently, Pallas still had some influence.

"Now when Porcius Festus was sent as successor to Felix by Nero, the principal of the Jewish inhabitants of Caesarea went up to Rome to accuse Felix; and he had certainly been brought to punishment, unless Nero had yielded to the importunate solicitations of his brother Pallas, who was at that time had in the greatest honor by him." — Josephus, Antiquities 20.182

There is a contradiction between Josephus (Antiquities 20.182) and Tacitus (Annals 13.14-15), where Tacitus has Pallas fall from grace in AD 55 while Josephus mention that Pallas was still in honor to defend his brother Felix.

By October 59, there seems to be issued new coins representing Year 6 of Nero indicating that Festus had arrived. If so, Felix may have been recalled prior to this and travelled during the winter to Rome in order to face the trial.

==== Execution ====
Pallas had lived as a Roman private citizen for years but did not elude Nero's wrath forever. In AD 62, Pallas was executed on the orders of Nero, perhaps by poisoning. Pallas was one of the wealthiest in the Roman Empire and Nero spent a large part of the treasury on his lavish projects, thus some speculate one motif for the killing was to gain access to large fortune of Pallas, part of which was his by right as Pallas' official patron. In addition, many of the "old guard" was executed in AD 62 by Nero.

== Burial ==
Outside Rome, the Tomb of Pallas was a notable monument reported to be before the first milestone on Via Tiburtina. It is reported by Pliny the Younger as on the road to modern Tivoli. The tomb has not been identified by archaeologists. In the 3rd century, Via Tiburtina became an importan Christian burial ground, especially known for the Catacomb of San Lorenzo. Indeed, the Basilica of San Lorenzo covers large parts of the former burial ground.

== Legacy ==
- Some money must have gone to Pallas' family, as a descendant of his, also named Marcus Antonius Pallas, became consul in 167.
- Other grave memorials related to the household of Pallas have been found, such as one set up by Lucius Nobilis Abascantus at Zagarolo (Rome), an administrator of the imperial grain reserves under Marcus Antonius Pallas, which is now in the Verona Maffeiano Museum.

== Fiction ==
Pallas is a character in Robert Graves' novel I, Claudius; in the TV series, he is portrayed by Bernard Hepton.

== Sources ==
- Oost, S.V. "The Career of M. Antonius Pallas." American Journal of Philology 79 (1958). 113–139.
- McNamara J. PLINY, TACITUS AND THE MONUMENTS OF PALLAS. The Classical Quarterly. 2021;71(1):308-329. doi:10.1017/S0009838821000203
