= Jacques Édouard Quecq =

French historical painter

Jacques Édouard Quecq (1796–1874) was a French historical painter. He was born and died in Cambrai. He was a pupil of Steuben. Among his works are:

- First Combat of Romulus and Remus, 1827
- Death of Vitellius, 1831
- Death of Britannicus, 1833
- After the Shipwreck, 1834
- Saint Waast, 1838
- Francis of Assisi, 1836
- San Carlo Borromeo during the Plague at Milan, 1840
- San Carlo Borromeo Administering the Viaticum to Pope Pius IV, 1842
- Martin of Tours, 1846
- Lais and Diogenes, 1850
- Christ Fainting Under the Cross, 1861
- Portrait of Louis XVIII
