= Faenius =

Faenius is a Roman nomen, sometimes confused with Fenius.

- Faenius Rufus, praetorian prefect under Nero
- Lucius Faenius Eumenes, mentioned in a vadimonium (legal document) found at Puteoli
- Lucius Faenius Felix, tribune in Britain mentioned several times in inscriptions.
