= Pythias (Roman) =

Pythias was a 1st-century female Roman slave (possibly of Greek origin) in the household of Octavia, the first wife of the Emperor Nero, who divorced Octavia in 62 AD to marry Poppaea Sabina. To fabricate evidence that could be used to justify murdering Octavia after the divorce, Poppaea and Tigellinus, the Prefect of the Praetorian Guard, attempted to compel Octavia's maids to make false claims of her adultery during her marriage to Nero. Pythias refused. She was tortured, but she famously proclaimed that Octavia's genitalia were cleaner than Tigellinus' mouth.

The earliest surviving version of the story appears to be that told by the Roman historian Tacitus (c56 - c120 AD) in his Annals, although he doesn't name the maid:

Dominating Nero as his wife, as she had long dominated him as his mistress, Poppaea incited one of Octavia's household to accuse Octavia of adultery with a slave - an Alexandrian flute-player called Eucaerus was designated for the role. Octavia's maids were tortured, and though some were induced by the pain to make false confessions, the majority unflinchingly maintained her innocence. One retorted that the mouth of Tigellinus, who was bullying her, was less clean than any part of Octavia. Nevertheless, [Octavia] was put away.

A later version of the story, which names Pythias as the maid, was told by the Roman historian Cassius Dio (c155 - c235 AD) in his Roman History:

It was to [Tigellinus] that the famous retort is said to have been made by Pythias. When all the other [female] attendants of Octavia, with the exception of Pythias, had taken sides with [Poppaea] Sabina in her attack upon the [former] empress ... Pythias alone had refused, though cruelly tortured, to utter lies against her mistress, and finally, as Tigellinus continued to urge her, she spat in his face, saying: "My mistress' privy parts are cleaner, Tigellinus, than your mouth."
