= Britannicus =

Son of Roman emperor Claudius (AD 41–55)

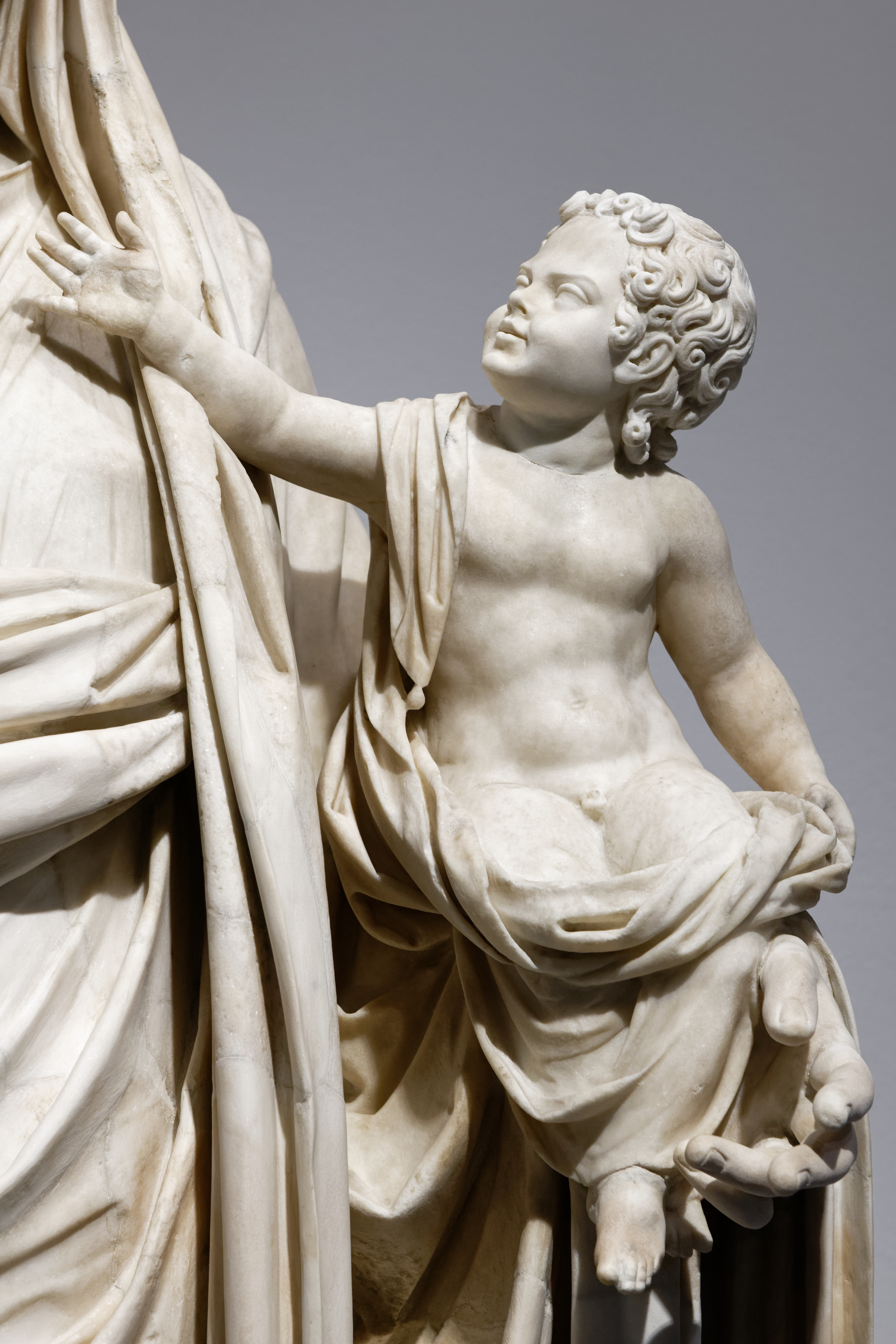
- Detail of Britannicus from a c. 45 AD statue with him and his mother
- Born: 12 February AD 41; Rome, Italia
- Died: 11 February AD 55 (aged 13); Rome, Italia
- Burial: Mausoleum of Augustus
Names
- Tiberius Claudius Caesar Britannicus; initially Tiberius Claudius Germanicus
- House: Julio-Claudian Dynasty
- Father: Claudius
- Mother: Valeria Messalina

Tiberius Claudius Caesar Britannicus (12 February AD 41 – 11 February AD 55), usually called Britannicus, was the son of Roman Emperor Claudius and his third wife, Valeria Messalina. For a time, he was considered his father's heir, but that changed after his mother's downfall in 48, when it was revealed she had engaged in a bigamous marriage without Claudius' knowledge. The next year, his father married Agrippina the Younger, Claudius' fourth and final marriage. Their marriage was followed by the adoption of Agrippina's son, Lucius Domitius Ahenobarbus, whose name became Nero as a result. His stepbrother would later be married to Britannicus' sister Octavia and soon eclipsed him as Claudius' heir. After his father's death in October 54, Nero became emperor. The sudden death of Britannicus shortly before his fourteenth birthday is reported by all extant sources as being the result of poisoning on Nero's orders; as Claudius' biological son, he represented a threat to Nero's claim to the throne. In Suetonius' The Twelve Caesars, he claims that Nero poisoned Britannicus out of envy of his voice, due to Nero's own obsession with performance and being the best entertainer of all time (as suggested by him wanting the games he hosted to be described as "the greatest ever undertaken").

== Name ==
Britannicus' name at birth was Tiberius Claudius Germanicus. The agnomen, his first surname Germanicus, was first awarded to his paternal grandfather, Drusus the Elder, after his death in 9 BC to commemorate his victories over the Germanic tribes. Accordingly, Drusus' sons (Claudius and Germanicus) inherited the name and passed it to their sons as well. Britannicus was given to his father in AD 43 after his conquest of Britain. Claudius never used it himself and gave the name to his son instead, and his full name became Tiberius Claudius Caesar Britannicus. He came to be known by his new name, which seems to have replaced Germanicus altogether.

== Background and family ==
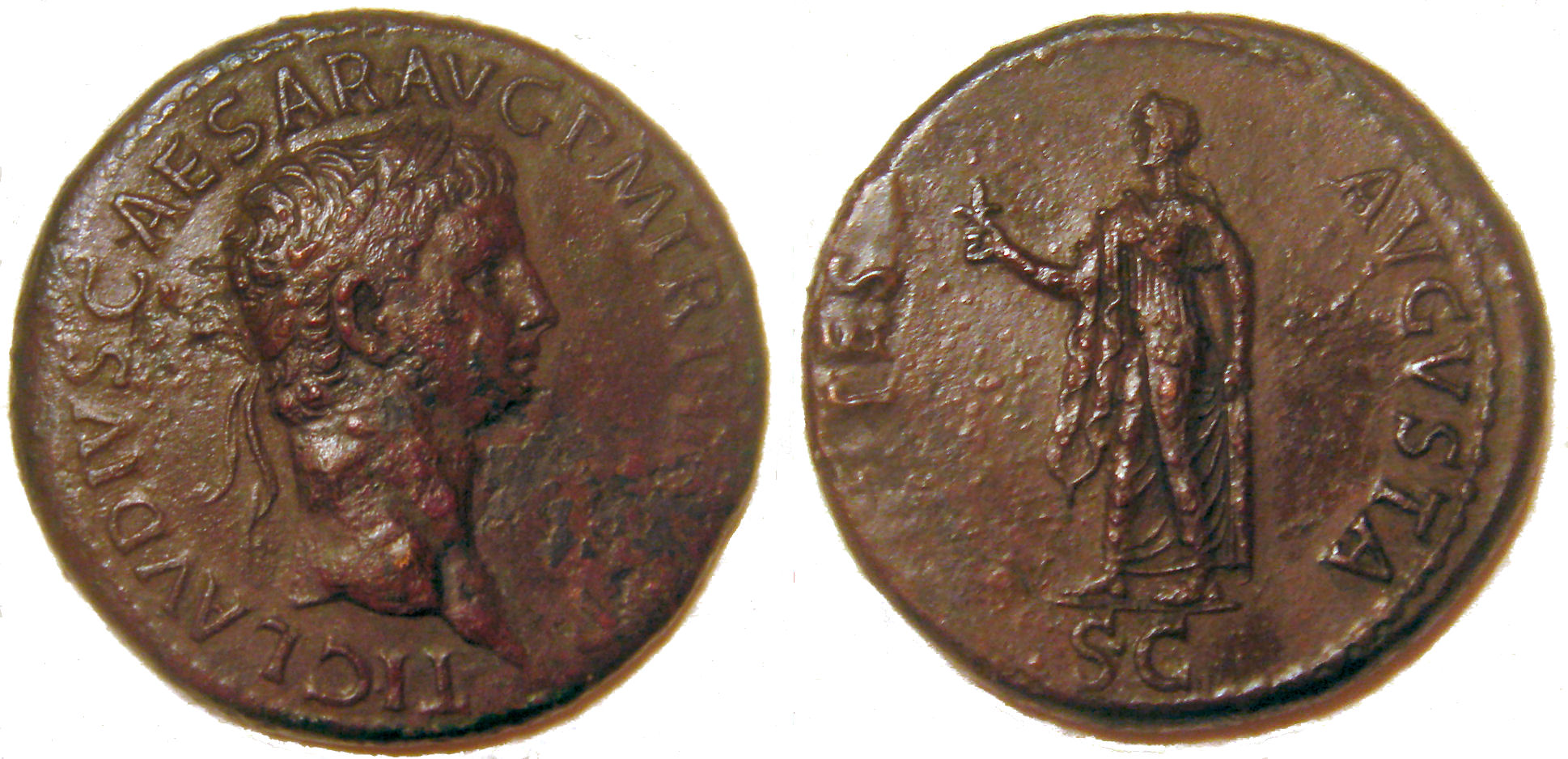
A sestertius issued to commemorate Britannicus' birth

Britannicus was born on or about 12 February 41 in Rome, to Emperor Claudius and his third wife, Valeria Messalina. As such, he was a member of the Julio-Claudian dynasty, specifically of the gens Claudia. (Note: The exact date of Britannicus' birthday is uncertain – the earliest possible date is early 39 or 40 and the latest AD 42. The year 41 is widely accepted because Britannicus was almost 14, and therefore on the cusp of assuming the toga virilis, when he was killed in 55 Smith 1880, p. 505. The day 12 February is based on the testimony of Suetonius that Britannicus was born on the twentieth day of his father's reign. (Lives of the Twelve Caesars, Life of Claudius, 27 ).) Britannicus' father had been reigning for less than a month, and his position was boosted greatly by the birth of an heir. To mark the birth, the emperor issued sestertii with the obverse Spes Augusta, the hope of the imperial family.

Britannicus had four siblings: a half-brother, Claudius Drusus, by Claudius' first wife (Plautia Urgulanilla), though he died before Britannicus was born; a half-sister, Antonia, by Claudius' second wife (Aelia Paetina); a sister by the same mother named Octavia; and an adoptive brother, Lucius Domitius Ahenobarbus (the future Emperor Nero), who was adopted in AD 49 and renamed Nero Claudius Caesar as a result.

Two years later, in 43, Claudius was granted the honorific "Britannicus" by the Senate as a reward for his conquest of Britain. The emperor never used the name himself but allowed his son to inherit it and it is the name by which the boy became known to posterity. Gaius Suetonius Tranquillus, a Roman historian, wrote from the late first century that Claudius adored Britannicus; carried him around at public events; and "would wish him happy auspices, joined by the applauding throng".

== Father's marriage to Messalina ==
=== Education ===
Britannicus was tutored by Sosibius, who was a close associate of Publius Suillius Rufus and a friend of his mother. He was educated alongside Titus Vespasianus, the future emperor. They were brought up together and taught similar subjects by the same tutors.

In 47, Sosibius gave Claudius a reminder of the power and wealth, which threatened the emperor's throne. His tutor then, as part of his mother's contrivances, told the emperor of Decimus Valerius Asiaticus's involvement in the murder of Caligula and of his growing popularity in Rome. Sosibius went on, saying Asiaticus meant to rally Roman legions in Germania against the throne. Asiaticus was apprehended immediately and brought to Rome in chains. Sullius successfully pursued charges against other equestrians in the Senate. According to Cassius Dio, Asiaticus was put to death as a favour to Messalina for his property (the Gardens of Lucullus).

It was later voted by the Senate for Sosibius to be given a million sesterces for giving Britannicus the benefit of his teachings and Claudius that of his counsel (his involvement in the case against Asiaticus).

=== Fall of Messalina ===
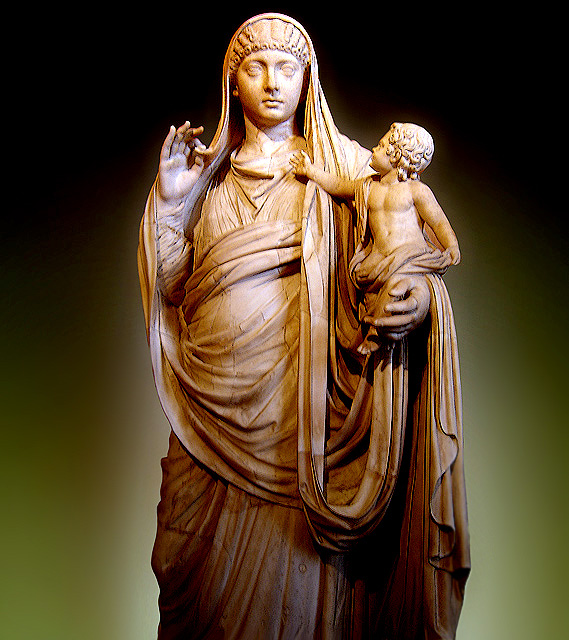
Messalina holding her son Britannicus, Louvre

Britannicus took part in the celebrations of Rome's 800th anniversary in AD 48. It was the sixth-ever Ludi Saeculares ("Secular Games") and sixty-four years since the last one had been held in the summer of 17 BC by Augustus. Britannicus' father was there, as was Lucius Domitius and his mother Agrippina, the last two surviving descendants of Germanicus. Claudius watched the young nobility, including Britannicus and Domitius, enact the Battle of Troy in the circus. Tacitus says that Domitius was greeted with more enthusiasm than Britannicus. (Note: Tacitus claims the enthusiasm in which the future Emperor Nero was greeted is a sign of his greatness. He wrote during the reign of Nero and in this same passage claimed to have overseen the seventh Ludi Saeculares, as it was his duty since he was a member of the Quindecimviri sacris faciundis and held the title of praetor (Tacitus, The Annals, XI.11–12).)

The games were seen as the introduction of Agrippina and Domitius to public life, and Britannicus' mother, Messalina, must have been aware of that and been envious of Agrippina. Tacitus writes that Messalina was too busy engaging in an "insane" affair to plot the destruction of Agrippina. He says:

She had grown so frantically enamoured of Gaius Silius, the handsomest of the young nobility of Rome, that she drove from his bed Junia Silana, a high-born lady, and had her lover wholly to herself. Silius was not unconscious of his wickedness and his peril; but a refusal would have insured destruction, and he had some hope of escaping exposure; the prize too was great, and so he consoled himself by awaiting the future and enjoying the present. As for her, careless of concealment, she went continually with a numerous retinue to his house, she haunted his steps, showered on him wealth and honours, and, at last, as though empire had passed to another, the slaves, the freedmen, the very furniture of the emperor were to been [sic] seen in the possession of the paramour.

— Tacitus, The Annales, 11.12

The affair continued into the next year. It was then that the affair between Messalina and Silius took a new turn. Silius, who had no children of his own, proposed to marry Messalina if she allowed him to adopt Britannicus. (Note: In the account of Cassius Dio, she proposed to marry him as she wanted to have affairs but also to hold many husbands. She also grants him a royal residence and grants him a consulship (Dio, LX.31).) The plan was to overthrow Claudius and rule together as regents of Britannicus. She acquiesced and waited for Claudius to leave Rome before she performed the sacrifice and entered the bigamous marriage. The illegal union was made known to Claudius by Callistus and Narcissus, freedmen in his service. Claudius had Messalina, Silius and others who knew of the affair put to death. Messalina was given a knife to kill herself, but a tribune of the Praetorian Guard had to force it through her neck. Images and statues of Silius and his associates were ordered to be destroyed.

== Father's marriage to Agrippina ==
The fall of Silius and Messalina opened the way for Agrippina the Younger to become his father's fourth wife. His father claimed to be uninterested in another marriage, but it was not long until he remarried. Unlike his uncle Germanicus, his father had never been adopted into the Julii. Claudius thought that marrying his niece would bring his family closer to that of Augustus, as Agrippina and Domitius were the last living descendants of Germanicus. Therefore, in 49, although a marriage between uncle and niece was incestuous under Roman law, his father remarried. As a daughter of Germanicus and a descendant of Augustus, she was very popular among soldiers and the people. In short, her excellent bloodline and strong political connections made her an attractive candidate for marriage.

=== Rise of Nero ===
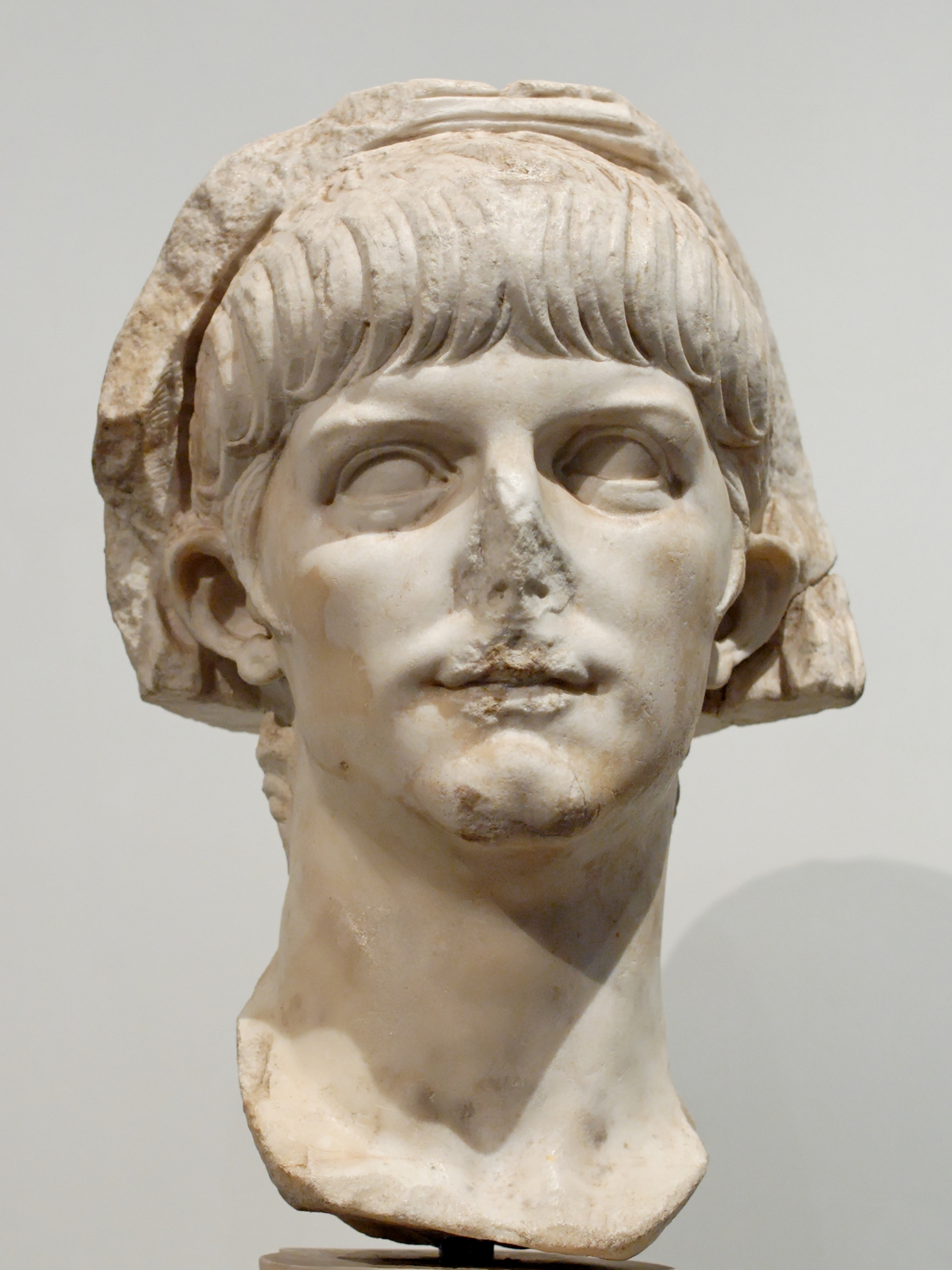
Bust of the young Nero

In 49, during the term of consul-elect Mammius Pollio (March–June), Domitius was betrothed to his sister Octavia and thus became his equal in rank. Tacitus suggests that move had the support of those who feared the vengeance of Britannicus against those who wronged his mother.

By the insistence of Pallas, his father was convinced to adopt Domitius as his son. Claudius was convinced to do as Augustus had done in adopting Gaius and Lucius Caesar and as Tiberius had done in adopting Germanicus although he already had a son. In February 50, his father passed a law adopting Domitius into the Claudii and naming him Nero, and Domitius became "Nero Claudius Caesar". Nero and Britannicus then became joint heirs to the emperor, and Agrippina was then given the title of Augusta.

In AD 51, his brother Nero assumed the toga virilis although he was not yet 14. The Senate also decided then that Nero should hold the consulship during his twentieth year (AD 56) and that as consul-elect, that he should enjoy imperium proconsulare ("proconsular authority") beyond the limits of Rome with the title of princeps iuventutis ("prince of the youth of Rome"). The progress of Nero seems to have followed in the footsteps of Gaius and Lucius Caesar. To mark the occasion, a donative was given to the soldiery of Rome, and presents to the people. His stepbrother's status, along with that of Agrippina, is echoed on contemporary coinage.

In contrast, Britannicus was progressively isolated. At the games of the circus, Nero appeared in triumphal robes while Britannicus was still dressed as a boy. Tacitus says their clothing at the games affected the expectations of the people: with Nero in a general's clothing and Britannicus in the dress of boyhood. He was not due for the toga until 12 February AD 55. He and his supporters were seen as a potential problem for Nero. Agrippina replaced his tutors with her own nominees and had convinced Claudius to order their executions, including the execution of Sosibius. Not only his tutors but also the two prefects of the Praetorian Guard, Lusius Geta and Rufius Crispinus, were replaced. Tacitus reports that they were thought to be sympathetic to the cause of Britannicus and of his mother. His stepmother had them replaced with Sextus Afranius Burrus, who was a good soldier but knew to whom he owed his allegiance.

Nero's career progressed steadily, and he gave speeches in AD 51 and 52. The speech in 51 thanked the emperor for honours given to him, and that of 52 was a vow for the safe recovery of the emperor from illness. It was in 53 that Nero married Britannicus' sister Octavia, who first had to be legally transferred to another family to obviate charges of incest. By then, it became clear that Nero was the unambiguous designate. His stepbrother became more politically active following his marriage to Octavia. He exempted the people of Ilium from all public burdens by arguing that Rome was descended from Troy through Aeneas (the founder of the Julian line), procured funds for the colony of Bononia (now Bologna, Italy), which had been devastated by fire, and the people of Rhodes had their freedom restored. Meanwhile, Britannicus himself was kept in reserve in case Nero, who was widely seen as the heir, died.

== Death of Claudius ==
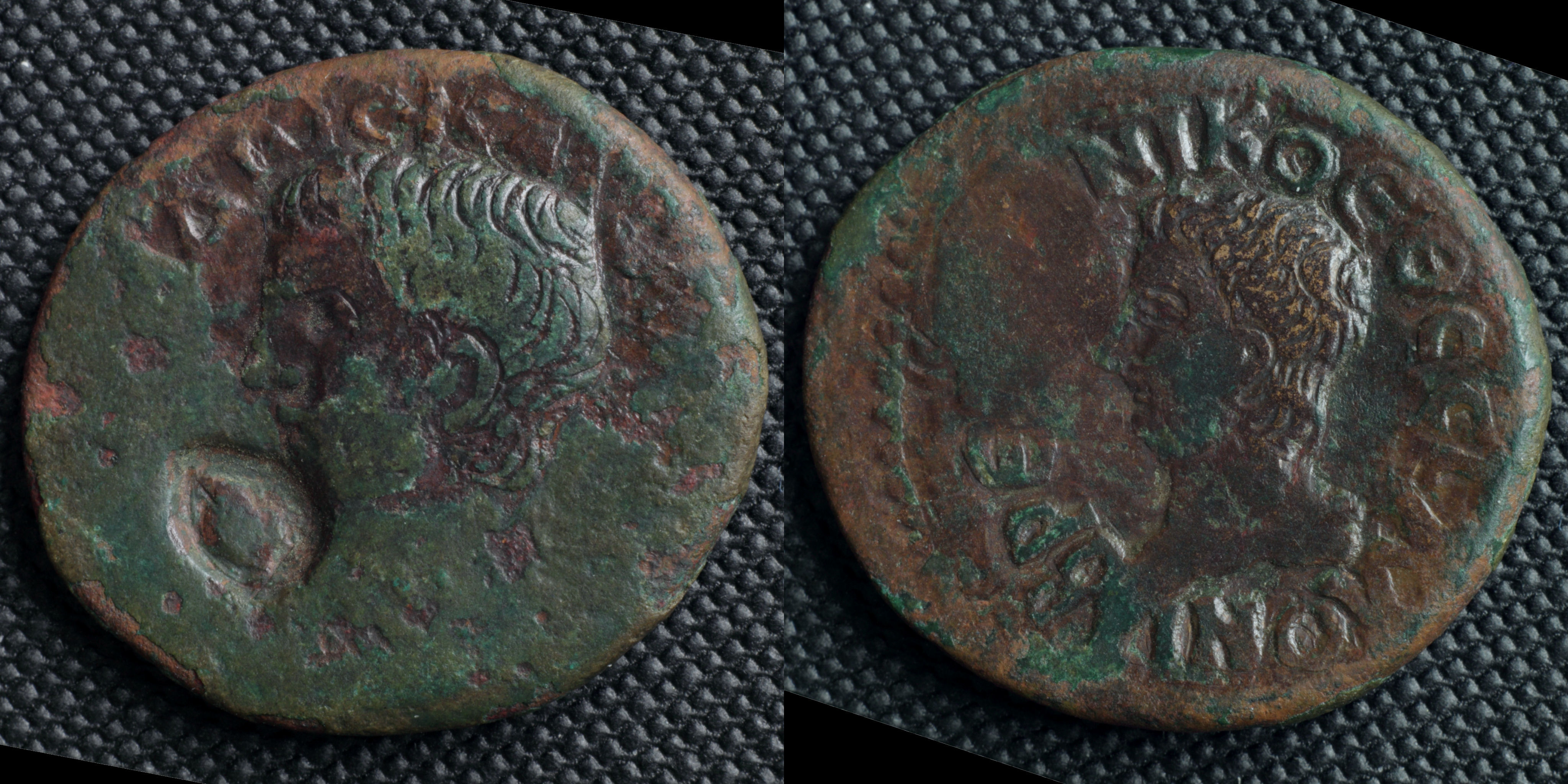

First side of the image: O: head of Claudius TI KΛAYΔIOC KAICAP CΕΒACTOC
Second side of the image: R: bust of Britannicus BPETANNIKOC ΘECCAΛONI
bronze coin struck in Thessalonica 53 - 54 AD; ref.: RPC 1588

Historian Suetonius reports that Claudius wished Rome to have a "real Caesar", and Britannicus enjoyed support from Claudius' loyal and influential freedman Narcissus. There are possible signs of support for Britannicus seen on coins from Moesia and North Africa that placed Britannicus' head and title on the obverse side. Claudius became aware of his wife's actions and began preparing for the end of her power. His father wished to bestow upon him the toga and to declare Britannicus as his heir. According to Suetonius, when Claudius mentioned his intention to give Britannicus the toga of manhood, he said, "That the Roman people may at last have a genuine Caesar."

The actions that Claudius took to preserve his rule in the short term were not easily undone as Britannicus approached manhood. In late 54, Britannicus was within six months of reaching manhood by Roman tradition and had matured early. According to Suetonius, Claudius began to mention divorcing Agrippina and dismissing Nero now that he was no longer needed. Suetonius reports that Claudius now admonished his son to grow up quickly, which implied that everything would be righted when he assumed the toga virilis.

On 13 October 54, Claudius died by natural causes or poison. In the accounts of his death by poison, Agrippina, aware of Claudius' intentions of placing Britannicus on the throne, had a well-known poisoner, Locusta, infuse mushrooms with poison that were fed to the emperor.

There were those who preferred Britannicus over Nero, such as Claudius' freedman Narcissus. Unfortunately for his cause, Narcissus was away in Campania when the emperor was poisoned, and Britannicus and his sisters, Octavia and Antonia, were kept out of sight in their rooms by Agrippina. Consequently, none could challenge Nero's succession. If one thought that Britannicus' claim should take precedence, the response was that Nero too was the son of Claudius, with Agrippina linking him back to Augustus. It did not help that many were convinced that Britannicus was no longer in the line of succession, a direct effect of the propaganda against him by Agrippina. Nero spoke the eulogy at the emperor's funeral and took sole power. Claudius' new will, which either granted joint rule to Britannicus and Nero or sole rule Britannicus, was suppressed by the new emperor's men in the Senate. (Note: Barrett argues that Tacitus' reference to the will being suppressed to prevent outrage about Nero meant that the will did not name Nero as primary or sole heir. Therefore, the Senate's elevation of Nero would have caused outrage if the will had been read Barrett 1996, p. 174.)

== Downfall and death ==
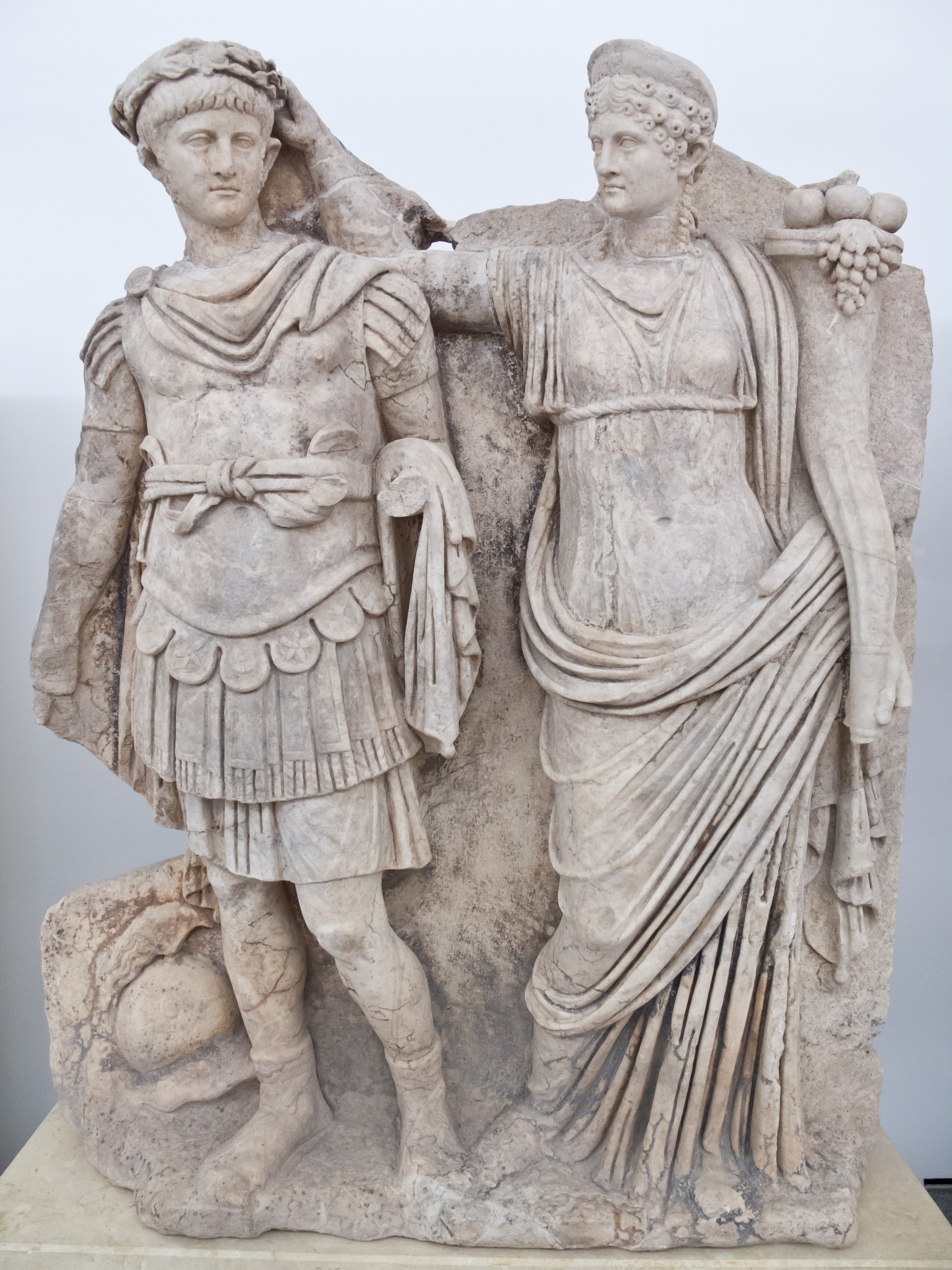
Agrippina crowns her young son Nero with a laurel wreath.

Immediately after the death of Claudius, Agrippina set upon removing those she had seen as a threat. Marcus Junius Silanus, proconsul of Asia whose brother Lucius had been eliminated by her as well, was poisoned for no other reason than that he had been the great-great-grandson of Augustus. Claudius' freedman Narcissus, Britannicus' champion according to Tacitus, had been driven to suicide after a harsh imprisonment. In Tacitus XIII, that was carried out by Agrippina against the wishes of Nero.

Before Nero's consulship in 55, he had forbidden the persecution of a Julius Densus, an equestrian whose partiality for Britannicus had been construed as a crime.

During his consulship, Nero had become more independent from his mother's influence. He began a relationship with a slave girl, and removed Pallas, a favourite of Agrippina, from his post as secretary of the treasury. In response, Agrippina threatened to champion the cause of Britannicus to keep her son in line. In the account of Tacitus, Agrippina says to Nero:

that Britannicus was now of full age, he who was the true and worthy heir of his father's sovereignty, which a son, by mere admission and adoption, was abusing in outrages on his mother. She shrank not from an utter exposure of the wickedness of that ill-starred house, of her own marriage, to begin with, and of her poisoner's craft. All that the gods and she herself had taken care of was that her stepson was yet alive; with him she would go to the camp, where on one side should be heard the daughter of Germanicus; on the other, the crippled Burrus and the exile Seneca, claiming, forsooth, with disfigured hand, and a pedant's tongue, the government of the world.

— Tacitus, The Annales, 13.14

Tacitus recounts Nero's numerous attempts to undermine Britannicus' image publicly. In one such attempt, during the feast of Saturn (the Saturnalia), he and Nero were playing a game among a group of their friends, and Nero chose Britannicus to sing a song with the expectation that Britannicus would embarrass himself. Britannicus, however, not only avoided humiliation but also generated sympathy amongst the guests by singing a poem telling the tale of how he had been cast aside in favour of Nero. The young emperor immediately began plotting his stepbrother's assassination.

According to Suetonius, Nero moved against Britannicus, employing the same poisoner, Locusta, who had been hired to murder his father, Claudius. The first dose failed, and Nero decided to throw caution to the wind. In the account of Suetonius, he had Locusta brought to his room to mix a faster acting poison before his very eyes, having ruthlessly beaten her for the prior inadequate dose. Locusta claimed this was to keep Nero's assassination under the radar by making the poisoning not as obvious, however it worked only as a laxative. After many tests on kids, there was a mixture that killed an animal instantly. Being pleased, Nero had the concoction brought immediately to the dining room.

Britannicus was poisoned at a dinner party attended by his sister, Octavia, Agrippina and several other notables. Tacitus' account of the event is that Britannicus was given a hot drink, which was tested by a food taster, and when he asked for it to be cooled, the poison was added to it with the cold water. The substance was instantly effective, and he "lost alike both voice and breath". Nero claimed to those present that Britannicus was merely experiencing an epileptic seizure and that he had been affected by the condition since childhood. He died sometime between December 54 and 11 February 55, the day before his 14th birthday, when he was to assume manhood, just four months after his father's death. For her service, the emperor had Locusta rewarded with large estates and even sent her pupils.

There is a theory that Britannicus was not poisoned but died of a seizure.

== Post mortem ==
Britannicus was cremated and his ashes placed with those of his father in the Mausoleum of Augustus. Nero held his funeral the very next day in the rain and gave no eulogy, saying it was "a tradition in the case of untimely deaths not to oppress the public with eulogies and processions." Dio states that Nero had the corpse covered in gypsum to cover the effects of the poison on the skin. While he was being carried through the Forum, the rain had uncovered the body, making plain to all who could see that he had been poisoned. The author and historian Beacham considers Dio's account to be "theatrical".

Britannicus was said to have criticised Nero's singing voice, and referred to his adoptive brother by his original name of Lucius Domitius. In favouring Nero, Claudius sealed the fate of his son and perhaps his own. Ominously for Agrippina, Seneca and Burrus did not complain: either they had been bought off or regarded Britannicus' death as inevitable given his relationship with Nero. Instead, they concentrated on growing their influence with the new emperor.

According to Suetonius, Britannicus was good friends with the future Emperor Titus, whose father, Vespasian, had commanded legions in Britain. As part of the Flavians' attempts to link themselves with the Julio-Claudians, Titus claimed that he had been seated with Britannicus on the night he was killed. He even claimed to have tasted the poison, which resulted in a serious and long illness. Titus would go on to erect a gold statue of his childhood friend and issue coins in his memory.

== Cultural depictions ==
Britannicus is portrayed in Britannicus (1669) by French playwright Jean Racine.

He was played by Graham Seed in I, Claudius, a 1976 television series by Jack Pulman.

== Bibliography ==
=== Primary sources ===
- Dio Cassius. Historia Romanum. Books LX–LXII.
- Suetonius. Twelve Caesars. Life of Claudius.
- Suetonius. Twelve Caesars. Life of Titus.
- Tacitus. Annals. Books XI–XIII.

=== Secondary sources ===
- Barrett, Anthony A. (1996). Agrippina: Mother of Nero. B. T. Batsford. ISBN 0-203-48106-2.
- Barrett, Anthony (1999). Agrippina: Sex, Power, and Politics in the Early Empire. New Haven: Yale University Press.
- Beacham, Richard C. (1999). Spectacle Entertainments of Early Imperial Rome. Yale University Press. ISBN 0-300-07382-8.
- Burgwinkle, William; Hammond, Nicholas; Wilson, Emma (2011). The Cambridge History of French. Cambridge University Press. ISBN 9780521897860.
- Dando-Collins, Stephen (2008). Blood of the Caesars: How the Murder of Germanicus Led to the Fall of Rome. Wiley. ISBN 9780470137413.
- Hornblower, Simon; Spawforth, Antony; Esther, Eidinow (2012). The Oxford Classical Dictionary (4 ed.). Oxford University Press. ISBN 9780199545568.
- Momigliano, Arnaldo (1934). Claudius: the Emperor and His Achievement. Cambridge: Trans. W.D. Hogarth. W. Heffer and Sons.
- Oost, S.V. (1958). "The Career of M. Antonius Pallas". American Journal of Philology. 79 (2): 113–139. doi:10.2307/292103. JSTOR 292103.
- Osgood, Josiah (2011). Claudius Caesar: Image and Power in the Early Roman Empire. Cambridge University Press. ISBN 9780521881814.
- Newcomb, Horace (1997), Encyclopedia of Television, Routledge, ISBN 978-0-203-93734-1
- Scramuzza, Vincent (1940). The Emperor Claudius. Cambridge: Harvard University Press.
- Shotter, David (2014). Nero Caesar Augustus: Emperor of Rome. Routledge. ISBN 9781317865902.
- Shotter, David (1997). Nero. Routledge. ISBN 9780415129312.
- Levick, Barbara (2012). Claudius. New Haven: Yale University Press. ISBN 9781135107710.
- Woodman, A.J. (2009), The Cambridge Companion to Tacitus, Cambridge University Press, ISBN 9780521874601
- Girolamo Cardano Neronis Encomium Translated by Angelo Paratico as Emperor Nero: son of promise, child of hope Gingko Edizioni, Verona, 2019. ISBN 978-1-6891-1853-8
