= Claudia Octavia =

Roman empress from AD 54 to 62

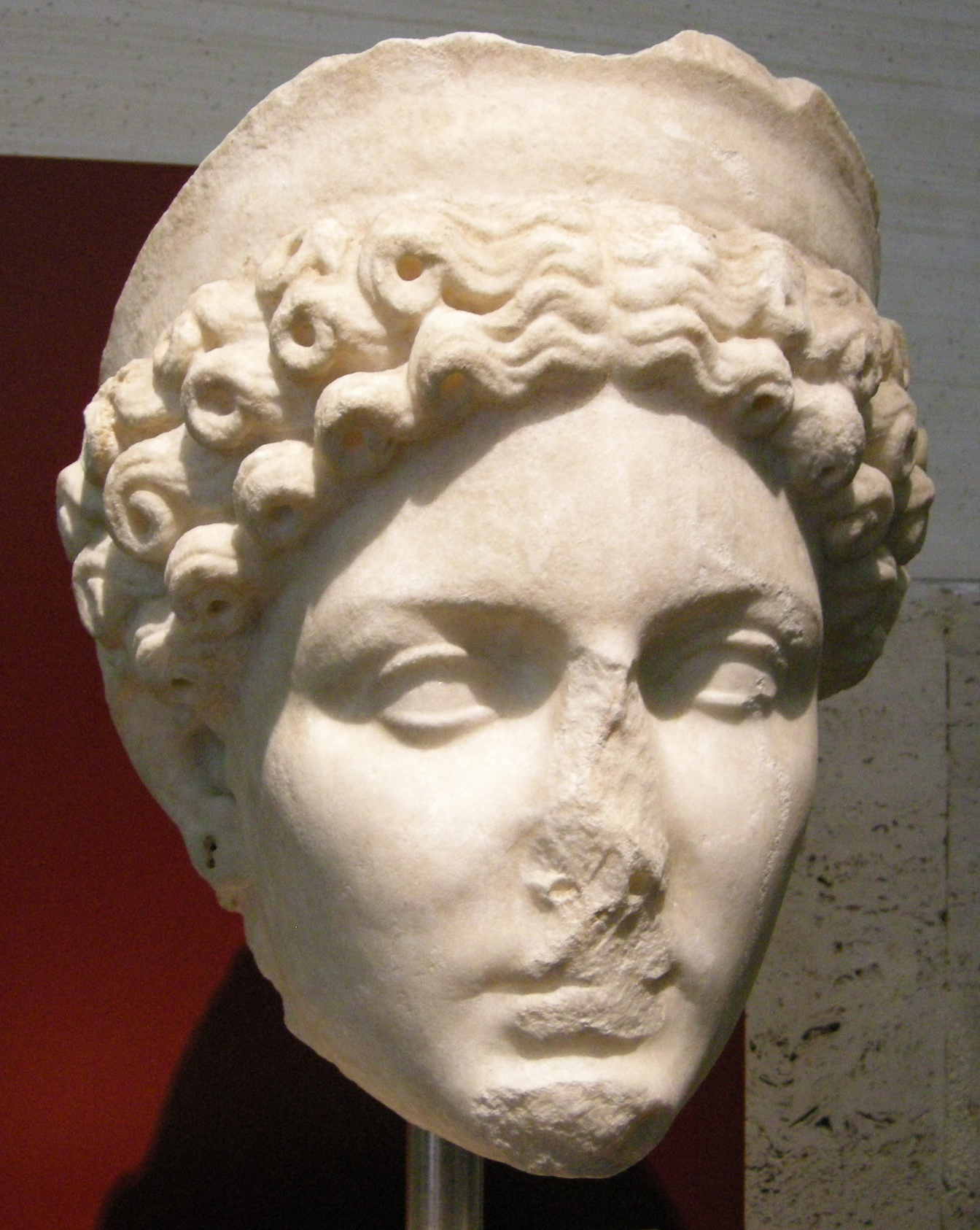
- Portrait head of Claudia Octavia, National Museum of Rome

Roman empress
- Tenure: October 13, AD 54 – June 9, AD 62
- Born: late AD 39/early AD 40; Rome
- Died: June 9, AD 62 (aged c. 22); Pandateria
- Spouse: Nero
- House: Julio-Claudian
- Father: Claudius
- Mother: Valeria Messalina

Claudia Octavia (late 39 or early 40 – June 9, AD 62) was a Roman empress. She was the daughter of the Emperor Claudius and Valeria Messalina. After her mother's death and father's remarriage to her cousin Agrippina the Younger, she became the stepsister of the future Emperor Nero. She also became his wife, in a marriage between the two which was arranged by Agrippina.

Octavia was popular with the Roman people, but she and Nero hated their marriage. When his mistress, Poppaea Sabina, became pregnant, he divorced and banished Octavia. When this led to a public outcry, he had her executed.

== Life ==
=== Family ===
Octavia was the elder of two children of Claudius and his third wife, Valeria Messalina. Her younger brother was Britannicus. She had older half-siblings through her father's earlier marriages. Her elder half-sister was Claudia Antonia, Claudius's daughter through his second marriage to Aelia Paetina. She also had a half-brother, Claudius Drusus, through Claudius's first marriage to Plautia Urgulanilla, although Drusus died before she was born.

She was named for her great-grandmother Octavia the Younger, sister of the Emperor Augustus.

=== Early life ===
She was born in Rome around 39 or 40 during the reign of her cousin Caligula. In January 41, Caligula was assassinated and her father was declared emperor. Shortly after Claudius' accession to the throne, her brother Britannicus was born on February 12. That same year, Claudius betrothed her to Lucius Junius Silanus Torquatus, a descendant of Augustus.

In 48, Messalina was engaged in an affair with the senator Gaius Silius, and the two held a wedding banquet when Claudius was away in Ostia. Claudius was informed by one of his advisors, the freedman Narcissus, and hurried back to Rome, concerned that the wedding was part of an attempt to overthrow him and make Silius emperor. Octavia and Britannicus were sent out to meet Claudius in an attempt to assuage his anger. Messalina's efforts to reconcile with Claudius were unsuccessful, and she was executed by the Praetorian Guard on orders that Narcissus presented as being from Claudius.

=== Claudius' remarriage and the rise of Nero ===
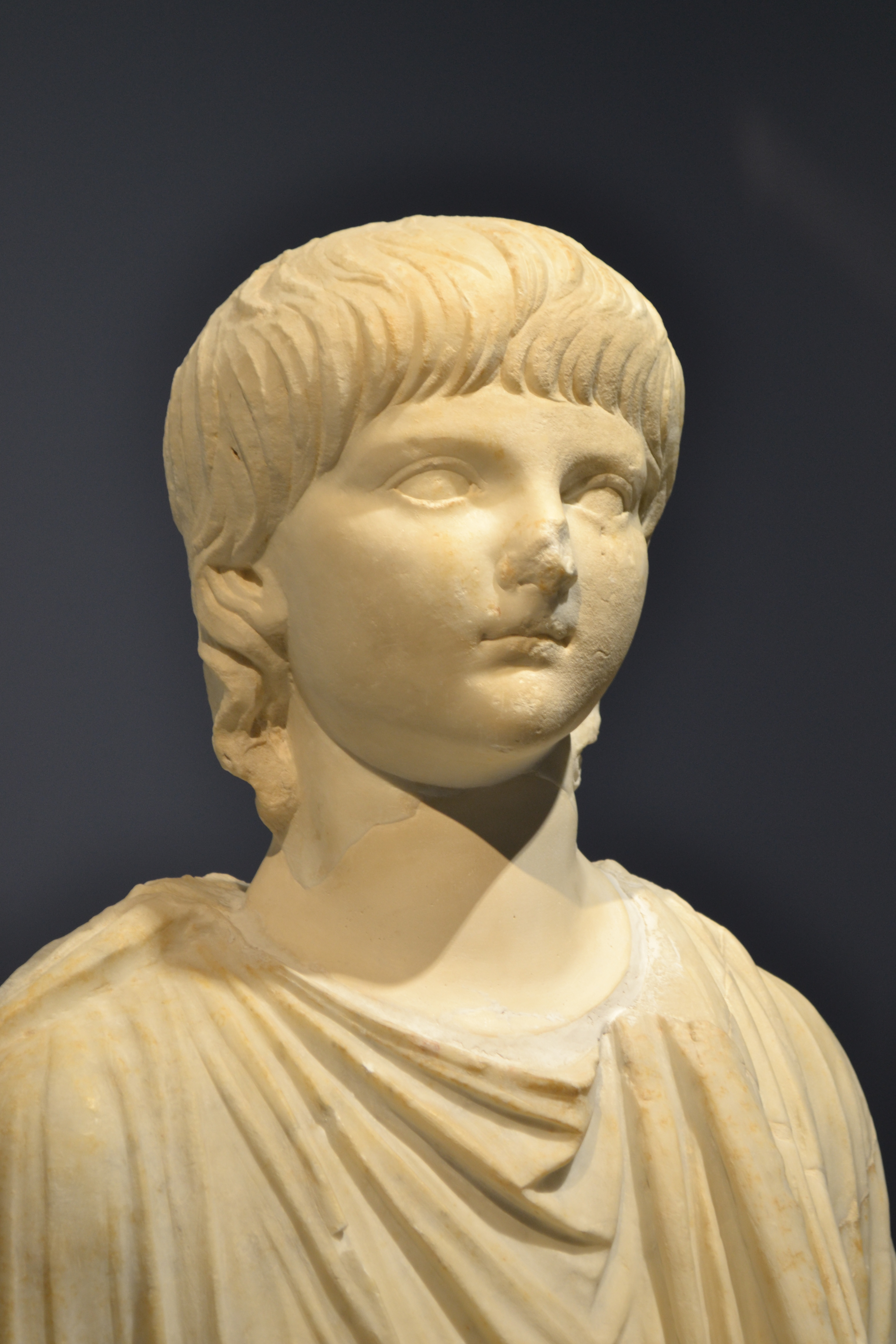
Octavia as a child, statue at the Archaeological and Art Museum of Maremma in Tuscany

Political concerns, including the need to dissuade further challenges to his legitimacy, motivated Claudius to remarry. Several candidates were proposed by his advisors; they included his former wife Aelia Paetina and Lollia Paulina, a wealthy noblewoman who had been married to Caligula for a short time. In 49, Claudius instead married Agrippina the Younger, daughter of the popular general Germanicus and also a descendant of Augustus. Germanicus was Claudius' older brother, making Agrippina Claudius' niece and Octavia's first cousin. The law prohibiting such a marriage was changed in order to proceed.

Agrippina had a son, Lucius Domitius Ahenobarbus from her first marriage to Gnaeus Domitius Ahenobarbus. In 50, Claudius adopted Lucius, who changed his name to Nero Claudius Caesar Drusus Germanicus.

Agrippina played an active and effective role in politics through her influence on Claudius; She controlled everything and everyone. She had Octavia's fiancé Silanus publicly accused of incest with his sister; he was forced to resign from his position of praetor and commit suicide. Suetonius reports the latter occurring on the same day as Claudius and Agrippina's marriage. She then had Octavia betrothed to Nero, who was additionally made an heir to Claudius. The marriage between Octavia and Nero was arranged in 48 and formalised in 53; the close connection to the marriage between Agrippina and Claudius shows that the union was primarily of political significance. To address the problem that they were now legally brother and sister, Octavia was first adopted into another patrician family.

=== Life as empress ===
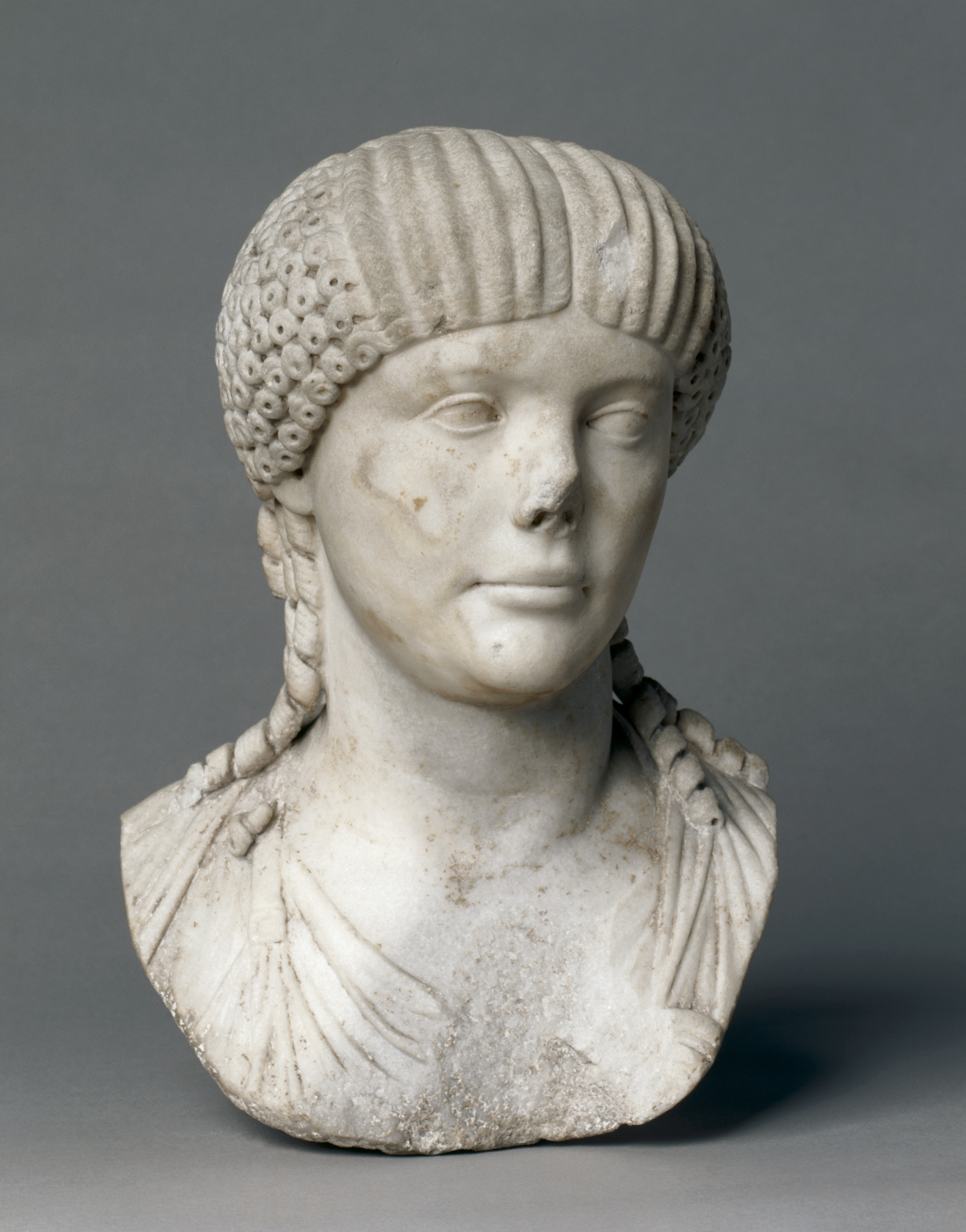
Bust of Octavia, Cleveland Museum of Art

On October 13, 54, Claudius became ill and died unexpectedly. The convenient timing of his death – Britannicus was rapidly approaching adulthood and might displace Nero as heir – led the ancient sources to accuse Agrippina of killing him, possibly with poisoned mushrooms. Although modern historians consider the death suspicious and Agrippina possibly guilty, they also note that Claudius was in his sixties and never in the best of health. On the same day, Nero was acclaimed emperor by the Praetorian Guard, and the senate acquiesced, formally investing him with power. Octavia was now married to the Emperor of Rome and was awarded the usual honours accordingly: public statues of her and inscriptions of honour to her were erected; her portrait was placed on coins in the local coinage of the eastern half of the empire; the priesthood of the Arval Brethren made annual sacrifices to her and Nero. Compared to her predecessors and successors as empresses, however, her husband did not place her in a particularly prominent position. For example, she was denied the title Augusta.

After becoming emperor, Nero's relationship with his mother began to deteriorate as the two vied for power. The next year, Britannicus suddenly died during a banquet where Octavia, Nero, and Agrippina were all present. Octavia and Agrippina were shocked at Britannicus' sudden illness, which Nero attributed to epilepsy. Britannicus, as the son of Claudius, had been a potential rival for the imperium, one that Agrippina had attempted to use as leverage in power struggles with her son. The suspicious death of Nero's rival led to the widespread assumption that Nero had had Britannicus poisoned; ancient writers including Tacitus, Suetonius, Cassius Dio, and Josephus all charge Nero with the murder of his stepbrother. Tacitus reports that by this point, Octavia "had learned to hide her griefs, her affections, her every emotion".

Octavia and Agrippina grew close after the death of Britannicus. Nero began to have affairs, first with Claudia Acte, a freedwoman, and then with Poppaea Sabina, the wife of his friend Marcus Salvius Otho. Nero's infidelities and his expressed desire to marry one of his mistresses resulted in another conflict in the ongoing power struggles between Nero and Agrippina. These came to an end in March 59 when Nero, possibly at the urging of Poppaea, murdered his mother with the assistance of Anicetus, an admiral and his former tutor.

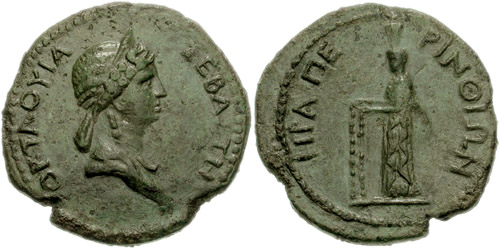
Coin of Claudia Octavia

Octavia was well-liked by the Roman populace, but her marriage to Nero was loveless and unhappy. Although Tacitus describes Octavia as "a noblewoman of proven virtue" and having a "modest demeanour", Nero had no interest in her and hated their marriage, and preferred to have affairs with Acte and Poppaea. When some in the court raised questions about his treatment of her, he responded that she should be content to be his wife in name only. According to Suetonius, he attempted to strangle her on several occasions.

The fact that Nero remained married to her for so long despite his dislike may have been due to the political significance of their marriage: As long as there was a political faction that did not consider Nero to be the rightful heir to the imperial throne, he had to endeavour to symbolically present the closest possible connection to his predecessors.

In 62, Nero no longer had the chief advisors of his early reign, as praetorian prefect Sextus Afranius Burrus died, and Seneca the Younger retired. This led to a shift in Nero's conduct that historian Barry Strauss referred to as "a turning point in the reign", as he increasingly exiled or executed those he considered his enemies. Burrus had previously advised Nero against divorcing Octavia. He positioned Nero's marriage to her as the source of his legitimacy as emperor, telling Nero that he would need to "give her back her dowry". The same year as Burrus' death, Poppaea became pregnant with Nero's child.

=== Divorce, banishment, and death ===
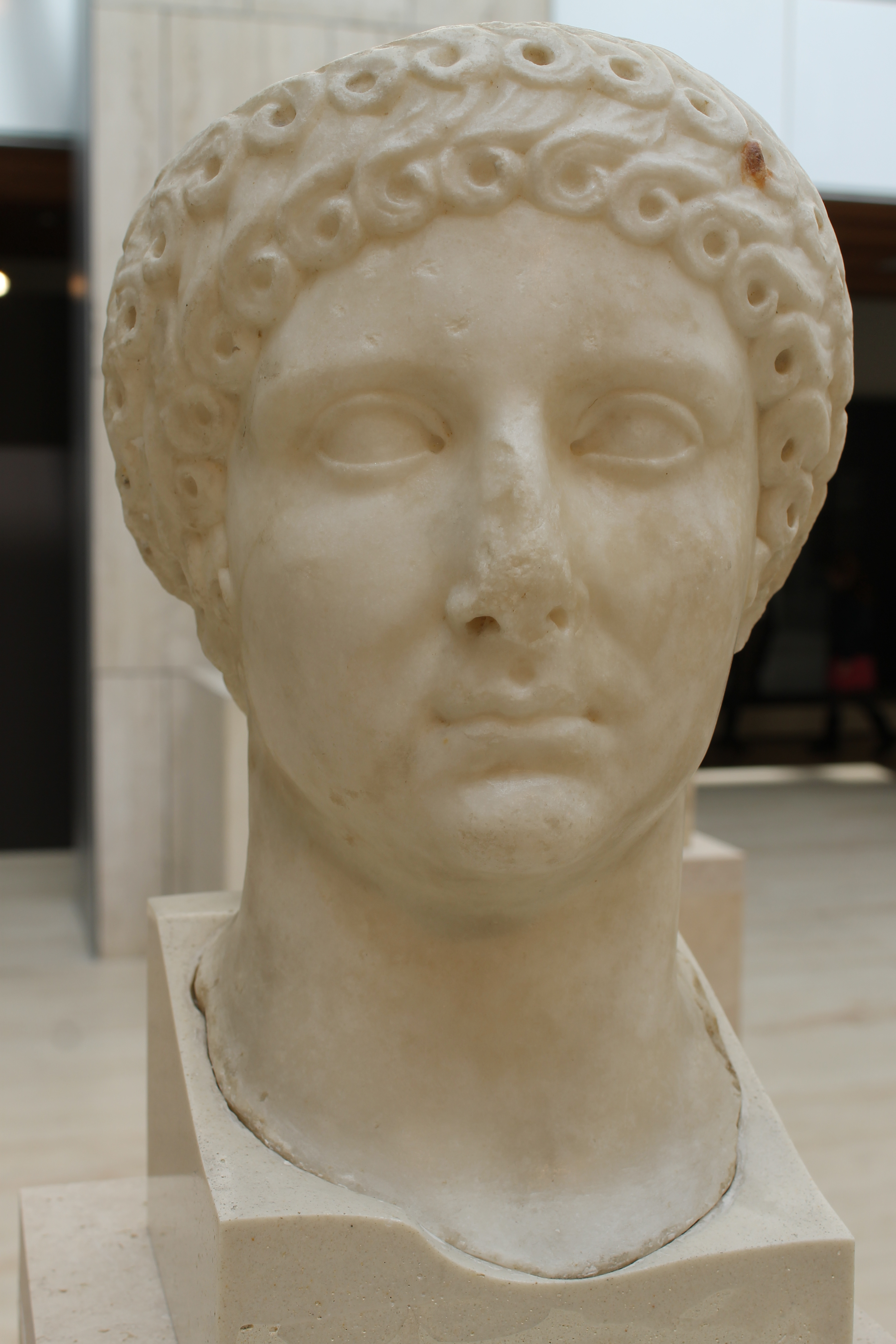
Bust of Poppaea Sabina, National Archaeological Museum, Madrid

Nero divorced Octavia, claiming that his lack of an heir was due to her sterility. As part of the divorce, he gave her properties previously belonging to Burrus and Rubellius Plautus, another Julio-Claudian relative he recently had killed. Nero married Poppaea shortly after – in Suetonius' account, twelve days after the divorce.

In an attempt to damage Octavia's reputation and with it her popularity, Nero and Poppaea also accused her of adultery with Eucaerus, a flute player from Alexandria. One of the new praetorian prefects, Ofonius Tigellinus, questioned Octavia's maidservants, including Pythias, under torture in order to corroborate this charge, but was largely unsuccessful. Nevertheless, Octavia was exiled to Campania.

The people of Rome responded to Octavia's banishment with widespread public protests that historian Vasily Rudich described as "the most pronounced mass disturbance [in the city of Rome] under Nero until the very moment of his overthrow". The protests were largely against Poppaea; Nero was even cheered when rumors spread that he had changed his mind. Statues of Octavia were carried through the streets and erected in temples and the forum, while those of Poppaea were pulled down or damaged. While these riots are usually interpreted by scholars as a spontaneous expression of the Roman people's feelings, they could ultimately have been instigated by a politically influential Claudius-friendly faction who were dissatisfied with Nero's political actions.

Nero was unsure how to respond. According to Tacitus, Poppaea argued for harsher treatment of Octavia, claiming that the protesters were simply Octavia's clients and servants and did not really represent what the Roman populace thought. She also suggested that any husband found for Octavia could be a threat to his position. Contrary to this speech described by Tacitus, other ancient sources identify Nero as solely responsible for the banishment.

Nero is said to have asked Anicetus, his ally in the murder of Agrippina, to confess to adultery, offering him the options of rewards and a comfortable life in exile or death. Anicetus gave Nero the false confession he wanted and was exiled to Sardinia, where he eventually died of natural causes. Nero also accused Octavia of covering up this adultery with an abortion, even though his initial basis for divorce was a claim that she was sterile.

Octavia was exiled to the small island of Pandateria (now Ventotene), where Julia the Elder, Agrippina the Elder, and Julia Livilla had all previously been exiled. A few days after her arrival, soldiers arrived with the order to execute her. Her entreaties with her executioners were unsuccessful, and she was tied up. Her veins were cut in an attempt to simulate suicide, but when that took longer than expected, she was brought into a room full of hot steam to suffocate. She died on June 9, 62, at age 22. Her head was cut off and brought back to Poppaea.

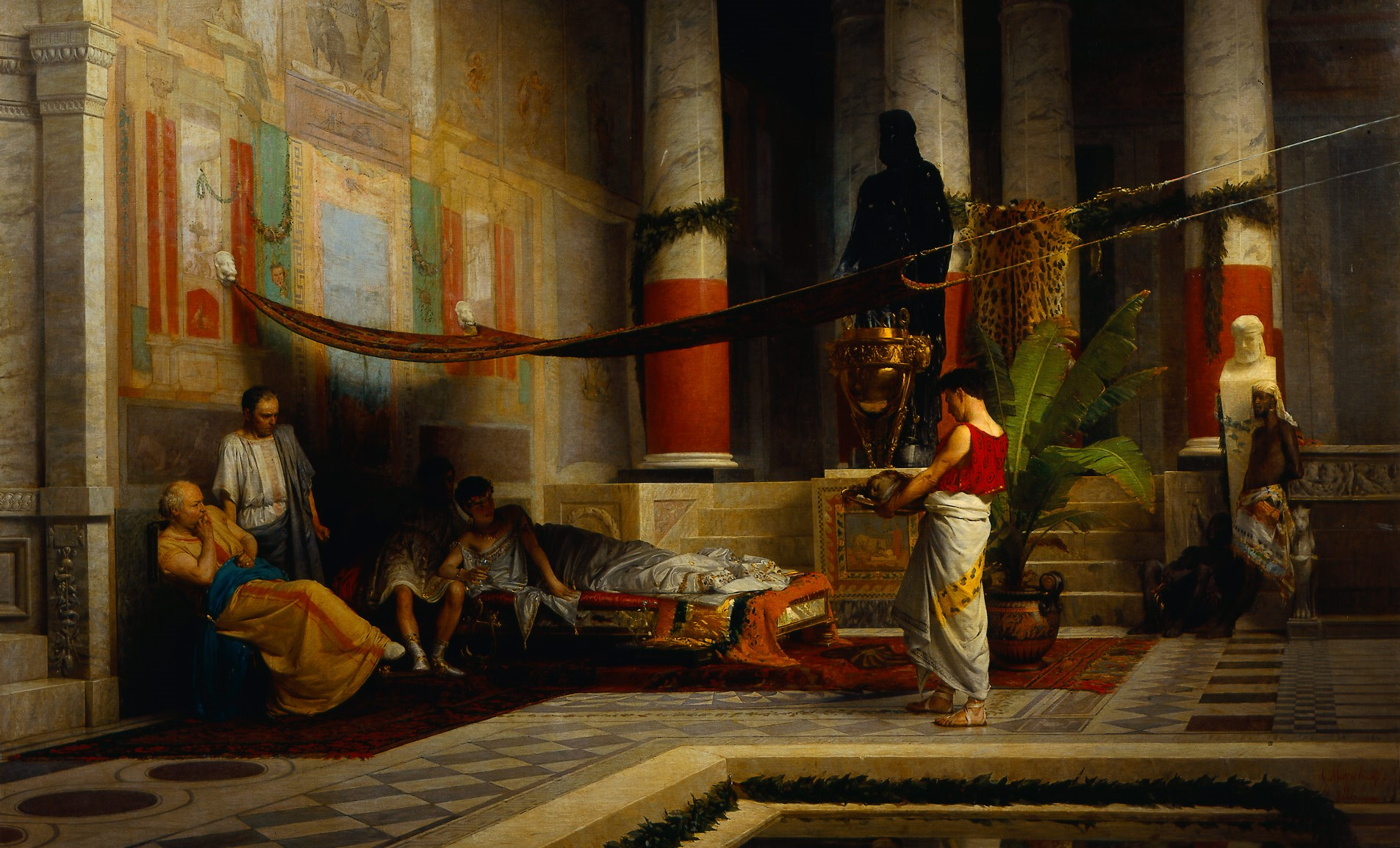
Poppaea Brings the Head of Octavia to Nero by Giovanni Muzzioli (1876)

Tacitus described the aftermath of her death as follows:

For all these things offerings were decreed to the temples — how often must those words be said? Let all who make their acquaintance with the history of that period in my narrative or that of others take so much for granted: as often as the emperor ordered an exile or a murder, so often was a thanksgiving addressed to Heaven; and what formerly betokened prosperity was now a symbol of public calamity. – Tacitus, The Annals

In the aftermath of the failed Pisonian conspiracy of 65, Praetorian Subrius Flavus listed Nero's murder of Octavia as one of the reasons for his participation when being questioned by Nero.

Poppaea would remain Nero's wife until her death in 65, a death usually attributed to Nero kicking her while she was pregnant. Nero would kill himself after armies rose in revolt against him, dying on June 9, 68, exactly six years after Octavia.

== In fiction ==
Her divorce from Nero is the subject of the play Octavia, the only example of Roman drama based on Roman history to survive in its entirety. It was written by an unknown author after Nero's death, possibly during the rule of the Flavian dynasty, and may have been the first written accusation that Nero was responsible for the Great Fire of Rome.

Beginning in the 17th century, there was an increase in operas and other dramatic works based on the life of Nero. The Octavia was likely an influence on some of these works, although to what extent is unclear. Octavia appears in works including Handel's lost opera Nero, Claudio Monteverdi's opera L'incoronazione di Poppea (1642/1643); Reinhard Keiser's opera Octavia (1705); Vittorio Alfieri's tragedy Ottavia (1783), in which she is portrayed as the devoted wife of Nero who is executed by her husband after Poppaea, Nero's mistress, helps frame her for adultery; and Johann Caspar Aiblinger's ballet La morte di Nerone (1815/1816). Some works took considerable creative liberties with the historical events, such as Giovanni Battista Bassani's Agrippina in Baia (1687), which contains a happy ending where all the characters survive and are successfully reconciled with each other.

Octavia is also the subject of the massive German novel Die Römische Octavia (1677–1707) by Anthony Ulrich, Duke of Brunswick-Wolfenbüttel, and a character in Robert Graves's novel Claudius the God (the sequel to I, Claudius) and the television series I, Claudius. She is the main character of the historical biographical novel Octavia: A Tale of Ancient Rome by Seymour van Santvoord (1923).

== See also ==
- Julio-Claudian family tree

== Sources ==
- Barrett, Anthony A. (1996). Agrippina: Mother of Nero. London: B T Batsford. ISBN 0-203-48106-2.
- Barrett, Anthony A., Agrippina: Sex, Power and Politics in the Early Roman Empire. Yale University Press, New Haven, 1999.
- Barrett, Anthony A. (2020). Rome is Burning: Nero and the Fire that Ended a Dynasty. Princeton: Princeton University Press. ISBN 978-0-691-17231-6.
- Bauman, Richard A. (1992). Women and Politics in Ancient Rome. London: Routledge. ISBN 0-203-42907-9.
- Dando-Collins, Stephen (2010). The Great Fire of Rome: The Fall of the Emperor Nero and his City. Da Capo Press. ISBN 978-0-306-81890-5.
- Griffin, Miriam T. (1984). Nero: The End of a Dynasty. Routledge. ISBN 0-203-13309-9.
- E. Groag, A. Stein, L. Petersen – e.a. (edd.), Prosopographia Imperii Romani saeculi I, II et III, Berlin, 1933 – . (PIR^{2})
- Holland, Tom (2015). Dynasty: The Rise and Fall of the House of Caesar. New York: Random House. ISBN 978-0-385-53784-1.
- Levick, Barbara (1990). Claudius. New Haven: Yale University Press. ISBN 0-300-04734-7.
- Manuwald, Gesine (2013). Nero in Opera: Librettos As Transformations of Ancient Sources. Berlin: De Gruyter. ISBN 978-3-11-031751-0.
- Meise, Eckhard (1969). Untersuchungen zur Geschichte der Julisch-Claudischen Dynastie [Studies on the history of the Julio-Claudian dynasty]. Munich: Beck. (on Claudia Octavia especially pp. 171-215).
- Romm, James (2014). Dying Every Day: Seneca at the Court of Nero. New York: Vintage Books. ISBN 978-0-307-74374-9.
- Rudich, Vasily (1993). Political Dissidence Under Nero: The Price of Dissimulation. London: Routledge. ISBN 0-203-97599-5.
- Strauss, Barry (2019). Ten Caesars: Roman Emperors from Augustus to Constantine. New York: Simon & Schuster. ISBN 978-1-4516-6883-4.
