= Gaius Nymphidius Sabinus =

Prefect of the Praetorian Guard during the rule of Emperor Nero (c.35-68 AD)

Nymphidius Sabinus
- Born: Rome
- Died: 68; Rome
- Military career
- Allegiance: Roman Empire
- Service years: 62–68
- Rank: Praetorian prefect
- Commands: Praetorian Guard

Gaius Nymphidius Sabinus (died 68) was a prefect of the Praetorian Guard during the rule of Emperor Nero from AD 65 until his death in 68. He shared this office together with Ofonius Tigellinus, replacing his previous colleague Faenius Rufus. During the second half of the 60s, Nero grew increasingly unpopular with the people and the army, leading to a number of rebellions which ultimately caused his downfall and suicide in 68. Nymphidius took part in the final conspiracy against Nero and persuaded the Praetorian Guard to desert him, but when he attempted to have himself declared emperor, he was killed by his own soldiers.

== Life ==
Nymphidius Sabinus was the son of an imperial freedwoman, Nymphidia (daughter of Gaius Julius Callistus). Galba records speculation that his father was a gladiator named Martianus, whom he resembled, but it was rumored that he was the illegitimate son of a previous Roman Emperor, Caligula.

After the Pisonian conspiracy against his alleged first cousin Nero in 65, executions created the opportunity for many to rise in Rome into positions of power. Among those to advance was Nymphidius, who became a colleague of Praetorian prefect Tigellinus in the Praetorian Guard after the latter's previous partner Faenius Rufus was put to death.

Nymphidius gradually consolidated some authority over the Praetorians, and his promise of material reward increased their willingness to declare for Galba during the provincial revolts of 68 which led to the senatorial rejection of Nero and to his suicide that same year.

Between the death of Nero and the arrival of Galba at Rome, Nymphidius wasted no time: he orchestrated the "resignation" of Tigellinus and stood as sole commander of the praetorian guard. Galba, however, appointed a replacement for Tigellinus, Cornelius Laco, and took several further steps to eliminate potential rivals (e.g., the murder of Lucius Clodius Macer in Africa), all of which must have made Nymphidius uneasy.

No longer content to help others to the throne, Nymphidius declared that he himself was a legitimate successor to Nero — a claim which he supported with the dubious assertion that he was the illegitimate son of the former emperor Caligula. He also took Nero's wife, Sporus, as his own wife. Sporus, who was a young male freedman, had been married to Nero (after he had had him castrated), and was said to resemble the emperor's second wife: Poppaea. The Praetorians recognized that Galba's approach counted for more than Nymphidius' presence, and killed the would-be usurper before their new Emperor arrived at Rome.

Nymphidius is significant not only because he played an instrumental part in the downfall of Nero, but also because he illustrates the heights to which even men of low birth could rise on their own initiative, as well as the tremendous importance of Praetorian loyalty for imperial succession in the turbulent Year of the Four Emperors which followed the death of Nero.

== See also ==
- List of Roman usurpers

== Bibliography ==
- Plutarch. Parallel Lives: Life of Galba.

Military offices
Preceded by Ofonius Tigellinus; Faenius Rufus	Praetorian prefect 65–68; With: Ofonius Tigellinus	Succeeded by Cornelius Laco
