= Rufrius Crispinus =

1st century AD Roman equestrian, commander of the Praetorian Guard and senator

- Died: 66; Sardinia
- Military career
- Allegiance: Roman Empire
- Service years: 43–50
- Rank: Praetorian prefect
- Commands: Praetorian Guard

Rufrius Crispinus was an equestrian who lived during the later Julio-Claudian dynasty. Under the Roman Emperor Claudius, he was the commander of the Praetorian Guard. In 47, he suppressed a rebellion and was promoted by the Senate to the rank of praetor and was given one and half a million sesterces.

In AD 51, the Empress Agrippina the Younger removed him from his command position and replaced him with Sextus Afranius Burrus. She regarded Crispinus as loyal to Messalina's memory.

Crispinus married Poppaea Sabina, who would later become Empress (also Nero's second wife) and would bear him a son of the same name. They divorced, and Poppaea married Otho, whom she also divorced, going on to marry the Emperor Nero.

Crispinus later became a member of the Roman Senate, due to property qualifications and enjoyed senatorial status. Martial passingly mentions his purple cloak suiting his complexion. In 65, due to Nero's hatred for him, he was banished. One year later, Nero ordered his execution.

== Sources ==
- Tacitus, Annals
- Suetonius, The Twelve Caesars, "Nero", & "Otho"
