= Ofonius Tigellinus =

Roman praetorian prefect (AD c. 10-69)

- Born: c. 10; Agrigentum, Sicily
- Died: 69; Sinuessa
- Military career
- Allegiance: Roman Empire
- Service years: 62–68
- Rank: Praetorian prefect
- Commands: Praetorian Guard

Ofonius Tigellinus (c. 10 – 69) was a prefect of the Roman imperial bodyguard, known as the Praetorian Guard, from 62 until 68, during the reign of Emperor Nero. Tigellinus gained imperial favour through his acquaintance with Nero's mother Agrippina the Younger, and was appointed prefect upon the death of his predecessor Sextus Afranius Burrus, a position Tigellinus held first with Faenius Rufus and then Nymphidius Sabinus.

As a friend of Nero he quickly gained a reputation around Rome for cruelty and callousness. During the second half of the 60s, however, the emperor became increasingly unpopular with the people and the army, leading to several rebellions which ultimately led to Nero's downfall and suicide in 68. When Nero's demise appeared imminent, Tigellinus deserted him and shifted his allegiance to the new emperor Galba. Unfortunately for Tigellinus, Galba was replaced by Otho barely six months after his accession. Otho ordered the execution of Tigellinus, upon which he committed suicide.

== Life ==
Gaius Ofonius Tigellinus, born in about 10 AD, was of humble origin. His family, of Greek descent, were natives of Agrigentum in Sicily. His father allegedly lived as an exile in Scyllaceum in Southern Italy, and Tigellinus may have been born there. In his twenties, he was living in Rome and was in contact with the Imperial Family. In 39, during the reign of Caligula, he was banished from the city. He had been accused of adultery with Agrippina the Younger and Julia Livilla, Caligula's two surviving sisters. His exile was ended by the new emperor, Claudius, in 41, but he was forbidden to enter the Imperial Palace.

Tigellinus was said by the Roman historian Tacitus to have had an immoral youth and a vicious old age. As an adult, he first worked as a merchant in Greece. Later, he inherited a fortune, bought land in Apulia and Calabria on the Italian mainland and devoted himself to breeding racehorses. It was through this profession that he eventually gained the acquaintance and favor of Nero, whom he aided and abetted in his vices and cruelties. Settling in Rome in about 60, he became Urban Prefect of the three Urban Cohorts, the city's paramilitary police force. On the death of Sextus Afranius Burrus in 62, Tigellinus succeeded him as Prefect of the Praetorian Guard. He persecuted his successive co-prefects, Faenius Rufus and Nymphidius Sabinus, to secure his position as one of Nero's closest and most trusted advisors. He also fabricated evidence to justify the murder of Nero's first wife, Claudia Octavia. In 64, he made himself notorious for the orgies that he arranged in the Basin of Agrippa.

In July of 64, he was suspected of incendiarism in connection with the Great Fire of Rome. After the fire had initially subsided it broke out again in Tigellinus' estate in the Amaelian district of the city. This led to the claim by Tacitus that Tigellinus was an arsonist.

In 65, during the investigation into the abortive conspiracy of Gaius Calpurnius Piso, he and Nero's second wife, Poppaea Sabina, formed a kind of imperial privy council, falsely accusing the courtier and novelist Petronius Arbiter of treason. Under house-arrest in the coastal resort of Cumae, Petronius did not wait for a sentence of execution to be passed. Instead, he chose to commit suicide by repeatedly slitting and rebinding his wrists—apparently over a period of several days, during which he entertained his friends—until he finally chose to be fatally drained of blood.

In 67 Tigellinus accompanied Nero on his tour of Greece. He had a role in the death of the famous General Corbulo, who had also been invited to come to Greece but was ordered to commit suicide.

In 68, when Nero's downfall appeared imminent, Tigellinus deserted him, supposedly suffering from 'incurable bodily diseases'. (He possibly had cancer.) With his co-prefect Nymphidius Sabinus, he brought about the defection of the Praetorian Guard. Nymphidius then ordered him to surrender his command. Under the new emperor, Galba, he managed to save his life by lavishing presents upon Titus Vinius, the favourite of Galba, and his widowed daughter, whose life Tigellinus had once saved.

The next emperor, Otho, upon his accession in January 69, was determined to remove someone who was so intensely hated by the people. At his country estate near the coastal spa city of Sinuessa, Tigellinus was given the imperial order to return to Rome. Knowing that he would be facing death, he attempted to save his life by resorting to bribery - he had vessels anchored in the bay for such an eventuality. When that failed, he gave the bribe money as a gift to Otho's messenger and was allowed to hold a farewell party. Afterwards, on the pretext that he needed to shave before leaving, he committed suicide by cutting his own throat with a razor.

== Tigellinus in later art ==
- Tigellinus appears as a character in the opera Neró i Acté (1928) by Juan Manén.
- Tigellinus appears in both the 1895 play and the 1932 film The Sign of the Cross. He is also depicted as a villain in Henryk Sienkiewicz's 1895 novel Quo Vadis and in the 6-hour 1985 mini-series A.D.. He appears in the 1934 science fiction novel Triplanetary by E. E. "Doc" Smith.
- In the 1951 film Quo Vadis, based on the novel, Tigellinus (played by Ralph Truman) is (unhistorically) stabbed to death by a rebel soldier with the cry of A sword from Plautius! in the Circus of Nero when the Roman people revolt against the emperor near the end of the film.
- He is a prominent character in the latter stages of the 1985 novel The Kingdom of the Wicked by Anthony Burgess.
- He is the leading character in John Hersey's 1972 novel portraying Rome as a police state, The Conspiracy.
- Tigellinus appears in Simon Scarrow's 2011 novel Praetorian (taking place in 51 AD) as an optio (junior officer) of the Praetorian Guard; at the end of the novel, he is promoted to second-in-command to Prefect Burrus, and expects to succeed him after Nero ascends to the throne.

== See also ==
- Pythias (Roman)

== Sources ==
- Tacitus Historiae 1.72.2, 1.72.19
- Tacitus Annales 14.51
- Stein, Arthur (1937), "Ofonius Tigellinus", Realencyclopädie der classischen Altertumswissenschaft, volume 17, part 2, columns 2056–2061.

Preceded by Sextus Afranius Burrus	Praetorian prefect 62–68; With: Faenius Rufus; Nymphidius Sabinus	Succeeded by Cornelius Laco
