= Faenius Rufus =

Roman Praetorian prefect from AD 55 to 62

Lucius Faenius Rufus
- Born: Unknown
- Died: 65; Rome
- Military career
- Allegiance: Roman Empire
- Service years: 62–65
- Rank: Praetorian prefect
- Commands: Praetorian Guard

Lucius Faenius Rufus, an eques Romanus, was praefectus annonae from AD 55 to 62. Tacitus reports that (unlike most holders of that office) he did not profit from it. With Tigellinus, he succeeded Sextus Afranius Burrus as praetorian prefect in AD 62. Rufus had a close association with Agrippina the Younger. In 65, however, he was executed for his part as a member of the Pisonian conspiracy against the Emperor Nero.

== Sources ==
- Tacitus, Annales, 14.51 and 15.50

Government offices
Preceded by Sextus Afranius Burrus	Praetorian prefect 62–65; With: Gaius Ophonius Tigellinus	Succeeded by Gaius Ophonius Tigellinus and Nymphidius Sabinus
