= Gaius Julius Callistus =

Greek freedman of Roman emperors Caligula and Claudius

Gaius Julius Callistus (Greek: Κάλλιστος; flourished 1st century) was a Greek imperial freedman during the reigns of Roman Emperors Caligula and Claudius. Callistus was originally a freedman of Caligula, and was given great authority during his reign, which he used to amass even greater wealth. He often advised Caligula on imperial policy and how to deal with emergent issues such as the abundant conspiracies against the emperor. He used his influence to help his friends, including Domitius Afer, whose treason case was dropped at Callistus' behest. However, Callistus was not immune from Caligula's wrath, and when a thwarted assassin named Callistus as a fellow conspirator in the failed plot, Caligula was ready to believe him. It was only pleading that saved Callistus' life.

This distrust by Caligula may have caused Callistus to turn on him. He is named by the ancient sources as a prime mover in Caligula's murder (24 January 41) rallying the other freedmen to the cause. When Claudius succeeded Caligula, he pardoned most of the conspirators.

In order to impress the new emperor Claudius, Callistus stated that Caligula had ordered him to murder Claudius several times, but he had always refused. Whether or not this was true, Claudius allowed Callistus to stay in the imperial service. Claudius divided the daily maintenance of the empire among various freedmen and Callistus became Secretary of Justice and Law. His job was to oversee the running of the courts and the conduct of trials. He used the position to amass personal wealth, and carried on much the way he had under Caligula, advising the emperor on policy and the like. Callistus persuaded Claudius to hire his friend Scribonius Largus as a personal physician. After the disgrace and death of Roman Empress Valeria Messalina, Callistus is said to have promoted Caligula's former wife Lollia Paulina as a replacement. He would have been acquainted with her from his days in Caligula's court.

Most of the details of Callistus' personal life and ultimate fate are unknown, although he was dead by the end of Claudius' reign. Claudius died by poison on 13 October 54. Callistus supposedly pushed his daughter Nymphidia to become one of Caligula's mistresses. Callistus' grandchild Nymphidius Sabinus later claimed to be the product of this union, and tried unsuccessfully to gain the principate in the Year of the Four Emperors.
