= Sextus Afranius Burrus =

Prefect of the Roman Praetorian Guard (AD 1–62)

- Born: 1 Gallia Narbonensis, Vasio
- Died: 62 (aged 60–61); Rome
- Military career
- Allegiance: Roman Empire
- Service years: 50 AD – 62
- Rank: Praetorian prefect
- Commands: Praetorian Guard

Sextus Afranius Burrus (born AD 1 in Vasio, Gallia Narbonensis; died AD 62) was a prefect of the Praetorian Guard and was, together with Seneca the Younger, an advisor to the Roman emperor Nero, making him a very powerful man in the early years of Nero's reign. The cognomen "Burrus" is Latin for "red" or "reddish-brown", likely referring to his hair color.

== Imperial Court ==
=== Emperor Claudius ===
Agrippina the Younger chose him as Prefect in 51 to secure her son Nero's place as emperor after the death of Claudius.

=== Emperor Nero ===
For the first eight years of Nero's rule, Burrus and Nero's former tutor Seneca helped maintain a stable government. Burrus acquiesced to Nero's murder of Agrippina the Younger but lost his influence over Nero anyway.

== Death ==
In 62 AD, Burrus apparently suffered from a tumor in his throat or larynx, which was likely the cause of his death. However, contemporary rumors claimed that Nero had poisoned him because he was annoyed by Burrus's outspoken opposition to his criminal activities. Suetonius reports that Nero sent him a poisonous medicine to treat the tumor in his throat. Tacitus, on the other hand, leaves it open whether these rumors were actually true.

== Sources ==
- Tacitus Annales 12.42; 14.51
- Suetonius Nero 35.5
- CIL XII, 5842 = ILS 1321
- Dio 62.13

Government offices
Preceded by Lusius Geta and Rufrius Crispinus	Praetorian prefect 50–62	Succeeded by Faenius Rufus and Gaius Ophonius Tigellinus
