= AD 69 =

AD 69 in various calendars
- Gregorian calendar: AD 69; LXIX
- Ab urbe condita: 822
- Assyrian calendar: 4819
- Balinese saka calendar: N/A
- Bengali calendar: −525 – −524
- Berber calendar: 1019
- Buddhist calendar: 613
- Burmese calendar: −569
- Byzantine calendar: 5577–5578
- Chinese calendar: 戊辰年 (Earth Dragon); 2766 or 2559 — to — 己巳年 (Earth Snake); 2767 or 2560
- Coptic calendar: −215 – −214
- Discordian calendar: 1235
- Ethiopian calendar: 61–62
- Hebrew calendar: 3829–3830
- Hindu calendars
- Vikram Samvat: 125–126
- Shaka Samvat: N/A
- Kali Yuga: 3169–3170
- Holocene calendar: 10069
- Iranian calendar: 553 BP – 552 BP
- Islamic calendar: 570 BH – 569 BH
- Javanese calendar: N/A
- Julian calendar: AD 69; LXIX
- Korean calendar: 2402
- Minguo calendar: 1843 before ROC 民前1843年
- Nanakshahi calendar: −1399
- Seleucid era: 380/381 AG
- Thai solar calendar: 611–612
- Tibetan calendar: ས་ཕོ་འབྲུག་ལོ་ (male Earth-Dragon); 195 or −186 or −958 — to — ས་མོ་སྦྲུལ་ལོ་ (female Earth-Snake); 196 or −185 or −957

Map of the Year of the Four Emperors

AD 69 (LXIX) was a common year starting on Sunday of the Julian calendar. In the Roman Empire, it was known as the Year of the consulship of Galba and Vinius (or, less frequently, year 822 Ab urbe condita). The denomination AD 69 for this year has been used since the early medieval period, when the Anno Domini calendar era became the prevalent method in Europe for naming years.

== Events ==
=== By place ===
==== Roman Empire ====
- The Year of the Four Emperors: After Nero's death, Galba, Otho, Vitellius and Vespasian succeed each other as emperor during the year. The year is marked by numerous instances of a breakdown in discipline and mutinous conduct amongst the Roman legions and the praetorian guard.
- January 1 – The Roman legions in Germania Superior refuse to swear loyalty to Galba. They rebel and proclaim Vitellius as emperor.
- January 10 – Lucius Calpurnius Piso Licinianus is adopted by Galba and appointed to deputy Roman Emperor.
- January 15 – Galba and his adopted son Piso are murdered by the Praetorian Guard on the Roman Forum.
- Otho seizes power in Rome, proclaims himself emperor, and reigns for three months before committing suicide.
- Marcus Trebellius Maximus, governor of Britannia, is forced to flee to Gaul after a mutiny of Legio XX Valeria Victrix at Deva Victrix (Chester).
- April 14 – First Battle of Bedriacum: Vitellius defeats Otho's legions; Otho commits suicide.
- April 17 – After the First Battle of Bedriacum, Vitellius becomes emperor.
- Marcus Vettius Bolanus becomes the new governor of Britain and faces a second insurrection of Venutius, king of the Brigantes.
- July 1 – two legions in Egypt, a legion in Syria, and a legion in Judea declare Vespasian emperor
- July 1 – Tiberius Julius Alexander orders his legions in Alexandria to swear allegiance to Vespasian as emperor.
- July 3 – The army of Judea swears allegiance to Vespasian as emperor.
- August 1 – Batavian rebellion: The Batavians in Germania Inferior (Netherlands) revolt under the leadership of Gaius Julius Civilis.
- German warbands cross over to join the revolt and attack the fortress at Mainz.
- The Batavians attack Roman forts on the Rhine frontier; Fectio and Traiectum (modern Utrecht) are destroyed.
- In Gallia Belgica, cohors II Tungrorum, raised from the inhabitants of Atuatuca Tungrorum in the north-west of the Ardennes Forest, revolt against the Romans.
- The Danubian legions of Raetia and Moesia proclaim Vespasian as emperor.
- October 24 – Second Battle of Bedriacum: Flavians under Antonius Primus defeat the Vitellians.
- December 22 – Vitellius is captured and murdered by the Gemonian stairs. Vespasian becomes emperor.
- Judea: The Jewish Revolt – Vespasian lays siege to Jerusalem; the city is captured the following year by his son Titus.
- Josephus, Jewish rebel leader, is dragged before Vespasian and becomes his historian (he "prophesied" him his elevation to the purple).
- Legio I Macriana liberatrix is disbanded.
- The Flavian dynasty starts.

==== China ====
Liumao/Liumiao, the sovereign of the Ailao, led a group of his people, some estimate more than 500 000, to submit to the Han Emperor. The Ailao occupied the upper regions of the Irrawaddy River basin in what is now known as northern Myanmar and China's southwest Yunnan province.

The first recorded crossing of the Qingshuilang Shan (清水郎山) mountains near Yongping, west of Kunming by Chinese explorers.

== Births ==
- Gaius Suetonius Tranquillus, Roman historian (approximate date)
- Polycarpus, bishop and martyr of Smyrna (d. AD 155)

== Deaths ==
- January 15
  - Cornelius Laco, Roman praetorian prefect (murdered)
  - Sempronius Densus, Roman bodyguard (killed)
  - Lucius Calpurnius Piso Licinianus, Roman deputy emperor (b. AD 38)
  - Servius Sulpicius Galba, Roman emperor (b. 3 BC)
- April 16 – Marcus Salvius Otho, Roman emperor (b. AD 32)
- December 20 – Titus Flavius Sabinus, Roman consul (murdered)
- December 22 – Aulus Vitellius Germanicus, Roman emperor (b. AD 15)
- Cartimandua, Queen of the Brigantes (approximate date)
- Gaius Ofonius Tigellinus, Roman praetorian prefect (suicide)
- Locusta, Roman female poison expert to Nero (executed)
- Lucius Vitellius (the Younger), Roman politician (executed)
- Marcus Hordeonius Flaccus, Roman politician (murdered)
- Titus Flavius Sabinus, brother of Vespasian
- Sextilia, mother of Aulus Vitellius and Lucius Vitellius (suicide)
- Sporus, Roman freedman and male lover of Nero (suicide)
- Titus Vinius, Roman general and consul (b. AD 12)
