= Sulpicius Florus =

1st-century Briton who served as an auxiliary infantryman in the Roman Army

Sulpicius Florus was a 1st-century Briton who served as an auxiliary infantryman in the Roman Army. He was given Roman citizenship by the emperor Galba and adopted his benefactor's gentile name, Sulpicius. However, he took part in Otho's coup against Galba in 69, and was one of the murderers of Galba's heir, Lucius Calpurnius Piso Licinianus.

== See also ==
- Sulpicia (gens)

== Sources ==
- Tacitus, Histories 1.43
