= List of people mentioned in the works of Tacitus =

List of persons mentioned in the works of Tacitus is a list of people of the culture known to Tacitus who are mentioned within his writings (this list is currently incomplete).

- Æmilia Lepida
- Agrippina (mother to Nero)
- Annius Pollio, a small amount of detail is shown in the article : Annia gens
- Antonia (sister-in-law to Tiberius)
- Apicata (first wife of Sejanus)
- Appius Silanus
- Artabanus (ruler)
- Asinius Gallus
- Calgacus
- Caligula (emperor)
- Cartimandua (ruler)
- C.Fusius Geminus (consul)
- Claudius
- Crepereius Gallus
- Faustus Cornelius Sulla (consul)
- Cotta Messalinus
- Dio (p. 35)
- Drusus Caesar (second son of Germanicus)
- Fulcinius Trio (consul)
- Galba
- Geminius Rufus (husband of Prisca)
- Germanicus
- Helvidius Priscus (friend of Sejanus)
- Junius Blæsus (unkle to Sejanus)
- Juvenal (p. 35)
- Publius Graecinus Laco (captain of the city cohorts)
- Latinius Latiaris
- L.Cassius Longinus (consul)
- Lentulus Getucilus (friend of Sejanus)
- Livia (empress)
- L.Rubellius Geminus (consul)
- Lucius Arruntius
- Lucius Piso
- Macro
- Marcus Vinicius (consul)
- Memmius Regulus (consul)
- Nero
- Nerva (lawyer)
- Obultronius Sabinus (quaestor aerarii)
- Pallas (a slave, for a while ... favourite of Claudius emperor)
- Pomponius Secundus
- Poppæus Sabinus
- Prisca (wife of Geminius Rufus)
- Regulus (consul)
- Satrius Secundus
- Scaurus Mamercus
- Sejanus
- Sexteidius Catullinus (consul)
- Thrasyllus (taught the art of prognostication)
- Tiberius
- Tigranes (for a time, ruler of Armenia)
- Tiridates (ruler)
- Velleius Paterculus (historian)
- Vibulenis Agrippa
- Vitellius
