= Icelus =

Icelus may refer to:

- Icelus or Icelos, another name for Phobetor, in Ovid's Metamorphoses
- Icelus (fish), a genus of fishes
- Icelus, a freedman who served the Roman Emperor Galba before his downfall
- A character in Saint Seiya: The Lost Canvas

== See also ==
- Erynnis icelus, (dreamy duskywing), a butterfly
