= Sulpicia gens =

Ancient Roman family

The gens Sulpicia was one of the most ancient patrician families at ancient Rome, and produced a succession of distinguished men, from the foundation of the Republic to the imperial period. The first member of the gens who obtained the consulship was Servius Sulpicius Camerinus Cornutus, in 500 BC, only nine years after the expulsion of the Tarquins, and the last of the name who appears on the consular list was Sextus Sulpicius Tertullus in AD 158. Although originally patrician, the family also possessed plebeian members, some of whom may have been descended from freedmen of the gens.

== Praenomina ==
The Sulpicii made regular use of only four praenomina: Publius, Servius, Quintus, and Gaius. The only other praenomen appearing under the Republic is Marcus, known from the father of Gaius Sulpicius Peticus, five times consul during the fourth century BC. The last of the Sulpicii known to have held the consulship, in the second century AD, was named Sextus, a praenomen otherwise unknown in this gens.

== Branches and cognomina ==
During the Republic, several branches of the Sulpician gens were identified by numerous cognomina, including Camerinus, Cornutus, Galba, Gallus, Longus, Paterculus, Peticus, Praetextatus, Quirinus, Rufus, and Saverrio. In addition to these cognomina, we meet with some other surnames belonging to freedmen and to other persons under the Empire. On coins we find the surnames Galba, Platorinus, Proclus, and Rufus.

Camerinus was the name of an old patrician family of the Sulpicia gens, which probably derived its name from the ancient town of Cameria or Camerium, in Latium. Many of them bore the agnomen Cornutus, from a Latin adjective meaning "horned". The Camerini frequently held the highest offices in the state in the early times of the Republic; but after 345 BC, when Servius Sulpicius Camerinus Rufus was consul, we do not hear of them again for upwards of three hundred years, till Quintus Sulpicius Camerinus obtained the consulship in AD 9. The family was reckoned one of the noblest in Rome in the early times of the Empire.

The Praetextati appear in the second half of the fifth century BC. The family appears to have been a small one, descended from the Camerini. It probably derived its name from one of several related meanings. Praetextus commonly referred to clothing with a decorative border, and especially to the toga praetexta, a toga with a purple border worn by boys and magistrates. Something veiled or concealed could also be described as praetextatus.

The Sulpicii Longi flourished during the fourth century BC, from the time of the Gallic sack of Rome in 390 to the period of the Samnite Wars. The cognomen Longus may have been bestowed upon the ancestor of this family because he was particularly tall.

The surname Rufus, meaning "red", probably referred to the color of the hair of one of the Sulpicii, and may have begun as a cadet branch of the Camerini, as both cognomina were united in the consul of 345 BC. Several Sulpicii bearing this surname appear towards the end of the Republic, but as some appear to have been patricians and others plebeians, they may have constituted two distinct families.

The Sulpicii Galli or Gali were a family of the second and third centuries BC. Their cognomen may refer to a cock, or to a Gaul. The greatest of this family, Gaius Sulpicius Gallus, was a successful general and statesman, as well as an orator and scholar much admired by Cicero.

The Sulpicii Galbae first came to prominence during the Second Punic War, and remained distinguished until the first century AD, when Servius Sulpicius Galba claimed the title of Emperor. Suetonius gives four possible explanations of this surname: that the first of the family burnt a town he had besieged, using torches smeared with galbanum, a type of gum; or that, chronically ill, he made regular use of a type of remedy wrapped in wool, known as galbeum; or that galba was a Gallic word for someone very fat; or instead that he resembled a galba, a grub or caterpillar. The surname may also share a common root with the adjective galbinus, a greenish-yellow color.

== Members ==
This list includes abbreviated praenomina. For an explanation of this practice, see filiation.

=== Sulpicii Camerini ===
- Publius Sulpicius Camerinus Cornutus, father of the consul of 500 BC.
- Servius Sulpicius P. f. Camerinus Cornutus, consul in 500 BC.
- Quintus Sulpicius Camerinus Cornutus, consul in 490 BC, and one of the ambassadors sent to intercede with Coriolanus.
- Servius Sulpicius Ser. f. P. n. Camerinus Cornutus, father of the consul of 461 BC.
- Servius Sulpicius Ser. f. Ser. n. Camerinus Cornutus, (Note: In one passage, Livy refers to him as Publius.) consul in 461 BC, and one of the Decemvirs of 451. In 446, he commanded the Roman cavalry against the Aequi and Volsci.
- Quintus Sulpicius Ser. f. Ser. n. Camerinus Cornutus, consular tribune in 402 and 398 BC.
- Servius Sulpicius Q. f. Ser. n. Camerinus, consul suffectus in 393 BC, and consular tribune in 391. He was interrex in 387.
- Servius Sulpicius (Camerinus) Rufus, consular tribune in 388, 384, and 383 BC.
- Gaius Sulpicius Camerinus, consular tribune in 382, and censor in 380 BC, resigned his office upon the death of his colleague.
- Servius Sulpicius Camerinus Rufus, consul 345 BC.
- Quintus Sulpicius Camerinus, grandfather of the consul of AD 9.
- Quintus Sulpicius Q. f. Camerinus, father of the consul of AD 9.
- Quintus Sulpicius Q. f. Q. n. Camerinus, consul in AD 9.
- Quintus Sulpicius Camerinus Peticus, consul in AD 46, he was accused of extortion while proconsul of Africa in 59, and shortly afterward put to death by Nero.
- Quintus Sulpicius Q. f. Camerinus Pythicus, the son of Peticus, was also put to death under Nero.

=== Sulpicii Praetextati ===
- Quintus Sulpicius Ser. f. Camerinus Praetextatus, consular tribune in 434 BC.
- Servius Sulpicius Praetextatus, consular tribune in 377, 376, 370, and 368 BC, sometimes confused with his kinsman, Servius Sulpicius Rufus.
- Sulpicia Praetextata, the wife of Marcus Licinius Crassus Frugi, consul in AD 64, is mentioned at the commencement of the reign of Vespasian, AD 70.

=== Sulpicii Petici ===
- Quintus Sulpicius Peticus, grandfather of the consul of 364 BC.
- Marcus Sulpicius Q. f. Peticus, father of the consul of 364 BC.
- Gaius Sulpicius M. f. Q. n. Peticus, censor in 366, consul in 364, 361, 355, 353, and 351 BC, and dictator in 358.

=== Sulpicii Longi ===
- Quintus Sulpicius Longus, consular tribune in 390 BC, negotiated with Brennus, and persuaded him to leave Rome.
- Servius Sulpicius Q. f. Longus, father of the consul of 337 BC.
- Gaius Sulpicius Ser. f. Q. n. Longus, consul in 337, 323, and 314 BC, and dictator in 312, triumphed over the Samnites.

=== Sulpicii Saverriones ===
- Publius Sulpicius Saverrio, grandfather of the consul of 304 BC.
- Servius Sulpicius P. f. Saverrio, father of the consul of 304 BC.
- Publius Sulpicius Ser. f. P. n. Saverrio, consul in 304 and censor in 300 BC, triumphed over the Samnites.
- Publius Sulpicius P. f. Ser. n. Saverrio, consul in 279 BC, during the war against Pyrrhus.

=== Sulpicii Paterculi ===
- Quintus Sulpicius Paterculus, grandfather of the consul of 258 BC.
- Quintus Sulpicius Q. f. Paterculus, father of the consul of 258 BC.
- Gaius Sulpicius Q. f. Q. n. Paterculus, consul in 258 BC, during the First Punic War, triumphed over the Carthaginians in Sicilia.
- Servius Sulpicius Paterculus, the father of Sulpicia, who dedicated the temple of Venus Verticordia.
- Sulpicia Ser. f., who married Quintus Fulvius Flaccus, was thought to be the chastest woman in Rome, selected to dedicate the temple of Venus Verticordia in 113 BC.

=== Sulpicii Galli ===
- Servius Sulpicius Gallus, grandfather of the consul of 243 BC.
- Gaius Sulpicius Ser. f. Gallus, father of the consul of 243 BC.
- Gaius Sulpicius C. f. Ser. n. Gallus, consul in 243 BC.
- Gaius Sulpicius C. f. Gallus, father of the consul of 166 BC.
- Gaius Sulpicius C. f. C. n. Gallus, a great scholar; as consul in 166 BC, triumphed over the Ligures.
- Gaius Sulpicius C. f. C. n. Gallus, died at an early age, and his death was borne by his father with great fortitude.
- Quintus Sulpicius C. f. C. n. Gallus, the orphan of the scholar Gaius Sulpicius Gallus, became the ward of his kinsman, Servius Sulpicius Galba, the consul of 144 BC. Publius Rutilius Rufus called Galba's public support for Quintus as a trick to earn sympathy.
- Galus Sulpicius, consul suffectus in 4 BC, is believed to be a descendant of Gaius Sulpicius Gallus, the consul of 166 BC.
- Galus Sulpicius, son of the Galus Sulpicius who was consul in 4 BC. He was triumvir monetalis in 5 BC.

=== Sulpicii Galbae ===
- Publius Sulpicius Galba, grandfather of Publius Sulpicius Galba Maximus, the consul of 211 BC.
- Servius Sulpicius P. f. Galba, father of Publius Sulpicius Galba Maximus, the consul of 211 BC.
- Publius Sulpicius Ser. f. P. n. Galba Maximus, consul in 211 and 200 BC, and dictator in 203.
- Servius Sulpicius Galba, curule aedile in 208 BC, (Note: Broughton gives Gaius Sulpicius Geminus.) and afterwards a pontifex, in the place of Quintus Fabius Maximus Verrucosus.
- Gaius Sulpicius Galba, elected pontifex in 202 BC, in place of Titus Manlius Torquatus, but he died circa 199.
- Servius Sulpicius Galba, as curule aedile in 189 BC, he used the fines collected by his office to dedicate twelve gilt shields in the temple of Hercules. He was praetor urbanus in 187, and an unsuccessful candidate for the consulship in 185.
- Gaius Sulpicius Galba, praetor urbanus in 171 BC.
- Servius Sulpicius Ser. f. P. n. Galba, tried for his atrocities against the Lusitani in 150 BC, but was acquitted, and served as consul in 144 BC. Cicero describes him as an orator of no mean talent.
- Gaius Sulpicius Ser. f. Ser. n. Galba, quaestor in 120 BC, and a pontifex, condemned by the lex Mamilia of 110 BC.
- Servius Sulpicius Ser. f. Ser. n. Galba, consul in 108 BC.
- Servius Sulpicius Galba, praetor about 91 BC.
- Publius Sulpicius Galba, appointed one of the judges in the case of Verres, in 70 BC, afterwards a pontifex and augur. He had been praetor, but the year is uncertain; perhaps 66.
- Servius Sulpicius (Ser. f.) Ser. n. Galba, praetor urbanus in 54 BC, and a friend of Caesar, but perhaps also one of the conspirators against him.
- Gaius Sulpicius Ser. f. (Ser. n.) Galba, a minor historian, and grandfather of the emperor Galba; he held the praetorship, but the year is uncertain.
- Gaius Sulpicius C. f. Ser. n. Galba, father of the emperor Galba, was consul suffectus in 5 BC.
- Servius Sulpicius C. f. Ser. n. Galba, younger son of the historian Gaius Sulpicius Galba, and uncle of Servius, the emperor.
- Gaius Sulpicius C. f. C. n. Galba, consul in AD 22, brother of the emperor Galba.
- Servius Sulpicius C. f. C. n. Galba, consul in 33, and emperor in AD 69.

=== Sulpicii Rufi ===
- Publius Sulpicius Rufus, (Note: His surname is attested only by Valerius Maximus, leading some scholars to question its authenticity, as this Sulpicius was a plebeian, and presumably unrelated to the jurist Servius Sulpicius Rufus, a patrician.) tribune of the plebs in 88 BC, a distinguished orator, and afterwards a partisan of Gaius Marius.
- Quintus Sulpicius Rufus, father of the jurist.
- Servius Sulpicius Q. f. Rufus, (Note: Sometimes referred to as "Servius Sulpicius Lemonia Rufus, although "Lemonia" was his voting tribe, rather than his personal name.) consul in 51 BC, an eminent jurist and contemporary of Cicero.
- Sulpicia, daughter of the consul of 51 BC. Wife of Lucius Cornelius Lentulus Cruscellio. Her husband was proscribed by the triumvirs in 43 BC. She followed her husband to Sicilia, against the wishes of her mother, Julia.
- Publius Sulpicius (P. f.) Rufus, praetor in 48 BC, had been a legate of Caesar in Gaul and during his first campaign in Hispania. He was censor in 42.
- Servius Sulpicius Ser. f. Q. n. Rufus, a supporter of Caesar, frequently mentioned by Cicero.
- Sulpicius Rufus, procurator of the public games, was slain by the emperor Claudius because he was privy to the marriage of Silius and Messalina.

=== Others ===
- Gaius Sulpicius, praetor in 211 BC, was assigned the province of Sicily.
- Sulpicia, the mother-in-law of Spurius Postumius Albinus, consul in 186 BC.
- Servius Sulpicius, mentioned by Quintus Horatius Flaccus as an author of love-poems.
- Publius Sulpicius (P. f.) Quirinus, censor in 42 BC, (Note: Broughton gives Publius Sulpicius Rufus, and does not mention either in 36.) and consul suffectus in 36 BC.
- Publius Sulpicius P. f. P. n. Quirinius, also called Quirinius, consul in 12 BC, and later governor of Syria.
- Sulpicius Flavus, a companion of the emperor Claudius, whom he assisted in the composition of his historical works.
- Gaius Sulpicius Hyginus, a resident of Pompeii in Campania, and the former master of Gaius Sulpicius Heraclida.
- Gaius Sulpicius Heraclida, the freedman of Gaius Sulpicius Hyginus at Puteoli in Campania, was the husband of Harmonia, and probably the father of Gaius Sulpicius Faustus, a banker at Pompeii during the middle of the first century. Gaius Sulpicius Onirus, also a banker at Pompeii, might be a younger son or grandson.
- Gaius Sulpicius (C. f.) Faustus, a banker at Pompeii during the middle of the first century, together with Gaius Sulpicius Onirus, probably either his younger brother or his son. He was probably the son of the freedman Gaius Sulpicius Heraclida. Gaius Sulpicius Cinnamus was his freedman, and acted as his agent.
- Gaius Sulpicius (C. f.) Onirus, a banker at Pompeii during the middle of the first century, together with Gaius Sulpicius Faustus, either his younger brother or perhaps his son. He was probably either the son or grandson of Gaius Sulpicius Heraclida.
- Gaius Sulpicius C. l. Cinnamus, the freedman of Gaius Sulpicius Faustus, a banker at Pompeii in the middle of the first century. He acted as agent for Faustus, while a Gaius Sulpicius Eutychus, also a freedman of this family, acted on behalf of Cinnamus.
- Gaius Sulpicius (C. l.) Eutychus, a freedman who acted as agent on behalf of the freedman Gaius Sulpicius Cinnamus, part of a banking family at Pompeii during the middle of the first century.
- Sulpicius Asper, a centurion, and one of the conspirators against Nero, discovered and put to death in AD 66.
- Sulpicius Florus, an infantryman granted Roman citizenship under the emperor Galba, who later participated in the emperor's overthrow.
- Sulpicius Blitho, a source cited by the biographer Cornelius Nepos.
- Sulpicia, a poet who lived during the latter part of the first century. Her love poetry, addressed to her husband, Calenus, were admired by Martial, Ausonius, and Sidonius Apollinaris. A satire upon the edict of Domitian banishing philosophers from Italy, found among the works of Ausonius, is generally attributed to her.
- Sulpicia Lepidina, the wife of Flavius Cerealis, prefect of a cohort at Vindolanda in Britannia, circa AD 103.
- Servius Sulpicius Similis, governor of Egypt from AD 107 to 112, and Praetorian Prefect from 112 to 118.
- Sulpicius Apollinaris, a grammarian, and a friend and contemporary of Aulus Gellius during the later second century. He was probably the same Sulpicius Apollinaris who was a tutor of Pertinax.
- Sulpicius of Carthage, the author of two poems in the Latin Anthology, identified by some authorities with Sulpicius Apollinaris.
- Sextus Sulpicius Tertullus, consul in AD 158.
- Sulpicia Memmia, one of the three wives of Alexander Severus. Her father was a man of consular rank; her grandfather's name was Catulus.
- Sulpicia Dryantilla, daughter of Sulpicius Pollio and wife of Roman usurper Regalianus during the Crisis of the Third Century. Received the title of Augusta. Possibly killed with her husband in 260.
- Sulpicius Lupercus Servastus, a Latin poet, of whom nothing is known except his elegy, De Cupiditate, and a Sapphic ode, De Vetustate.
- Sulpicius Severus, an ecclesiastical historian of the late 4th and early 5th centuries.

== Christian figures ==
- Sulpicius Severus, a saint from Aquitania who wrote the earliest biography of Saint Martin of Tours.
- Sulpitius, the name of several saints.

== See also ==
- List of Roman gentes

== Bibliography ==
- Polybius, Historiae (The Histories).
- Gaius Julius Caesar, Commentarii de Bello Gallico (Commentaries on the Gallic War), Commentarii de Bello Civili (Commentaries on the Civil War).
- Marcus Tullius Cicero, Academica Priora, Brutus, Cato Maior de Senectute, De Haruspicum Responsis, De Officiis, De Oratore, De Republica, Epistulae ad Atticum, Epistulae ad Familiares, In Verrem, Laelius de Amicitia, Orator ad M. Brutum, Philippicae, Pro Murena, Pro Gaio Rabirio Perduellionis Reo, Rhetorica ad Herennium (attributed), Tusculanae Quaestiones.
- Quintus Tullius Cicero, De Petitione Consulatus (attributed).
- Cornelius Nepos, De Viris Illustribus (On the Lives of Famous Men).
- Diodorus Siculus, Bibliotheca Historica (Library of History).
- Dionysius of Halicarnassus, Romaike Archaiologia (Roman Antiquities).
- Titus Livius (Livy), History of Rome.
- Strabo, Geographica.
- Marcus Velleius Paterculus, Compendium of Roman History.
- Valerius Maximus, Factorum ac Dictorum Memorabilium (Memorable Facts and Sayings).
- Quintus Asconius Pedianus, Commentarius in Oratio Ciceronis In Toga Candida (Commentary on Cicero's Oration In Toga Candida), Commentarius in Oratio Ciceronis Pro Scauro (Commentary on Cicero's Oration Pro Scauro).
- Gaius Plinius Secundus (Pliny the Elder), Naturalis Historia (Natural History).
- Gaius Plinius Caecilius Secundus (Pliny the Younger), Epistulae (Letters).
- Flavius Josephus, Antiquitates Judaïcae (Antiquities of the Jews).
- Publius Cornelius Tacitus, Annales, Historiae.
- Plutarchus, Lives of the Noble Greeks and Romans.
- Gaius Suetonius Tranquillus, De Vita Caesarum (Lives of the Caesars, or The Twelve Caesars).
- Marcus Cornelius Fronto, Epistulae (Letters).
- Appianus Alexandrinus (Appian), Bellum Civile (The Civil War), Hispanica (The Spanish Wars), Macedonica (The Macedonian Wars).
- Aulus Gellius, Noctes Atticae (Attic Nights).
- Lucius Cassius Dio Cocceianus (Cassius Dio), Roman History.
- Aelius Lampridius, Aelius Spartianus, Flavius Vopiscus, Julius Capitolinus, Trebellius Pollio, and Vulcatius Gallicanus, Historia Augusta (Augustan History).
- Julius Obsequens, Liber de Prodigiis (The Book of Prodigies).
- Sextus Aurelius Victor, De Caesaribus (On the Caesars).
- Aelius Donatus, Vita Virgilii (The Life of Vergil).
- Eutropius, Breviarium Historiae Romanae (Abridgement of the History of Rome).
- Decimius Magnus Ausonius, Cento Nuptialis.
- Paulus Orosius, Historiarum Adversum Paganos (History Against the Pagans).
- Ambrosius Theodosius Macrobius, Saturnalia.
- Gaius Sollius Modestus Apollinaris Sidonius, Panegyrici.
- Joannes Zonaras, Epitome Historiarum (Epitome of History).
- Pieter Burmann, Anthologia Latina (Latin Anthology), ed. Wernsdorf, (1759–1778).
- Johann Christian Wernsdorf, Poëtae Latini Minores (Minor Latin Poets), Altenburg, Helmstedt (1780–1799).
- Barthold Georg Niebuhr, The History of Rome, Julius Charles Hare and Connop Thirlwall, trans., John Smith, Cambridge (1828), Lectures on the History of Rome, (ed. L. Schmitz), Taylor, Walton, and Maberly, London (1849)..
- Henricus Meyerus, Oratorum Romanorum Fragmenta ab Appio inde Caeco usque ad Q. Aurelium Symmachum (Fragments of Roman Orators from Appius Claudius Caecus to Quintus Aurelius Symmachus), L. Bourgeois-Mazé, Paris (1837).
- Dictionary of Greek and Roman Biography and Mythology, William Smith, ed., Little, Brown and Company, Boston (1849).
- James H. Oliver, "C. Sulpicius Galba, Proconsul of Achaia", in American Journal of Archaeology, vol. 46, no. 3, pp. 380–388 (September 1942).
- T. Robert S. Broughton, The Magistrates of the Roman Republic, American Philological Association (1952).
- D.P. Simpson, Cassell's Latin and English Dictionary, Macmillan Publishing Company, New York (1963).
- Guido Bastianini, "Lista dei prefetti d'Egitto dal 30^{a} al 299^{p}", in Zeitschrift für Papyrologie und Epigraphik, No. 17, p. 281 (1975).
- Ernst Badian, "The Clever and the Wise: Two Roman cognomina in context", in Bulletin of the Institute of Classical Studies, vol. 35, supp. 51, pp. 6–12 (1988).
- Richard J. Evans, "Reviewed Work: The Patrician Tribune: Publius Clodius Pulcher by J. Jeffrey Tatum", in Mnemosyne, 4th series, vol. 55, No. 6, pp. 764–767 (2002), JSTOR 4433399.
