= Battle of Vesontio =

Battle of Vesontio may refer to:

- Battle of Vosges (58 BC)
- Battle of Vesontio (68)
