= Capax imperii nisi imperasset =

Latin quote written by Tacitus

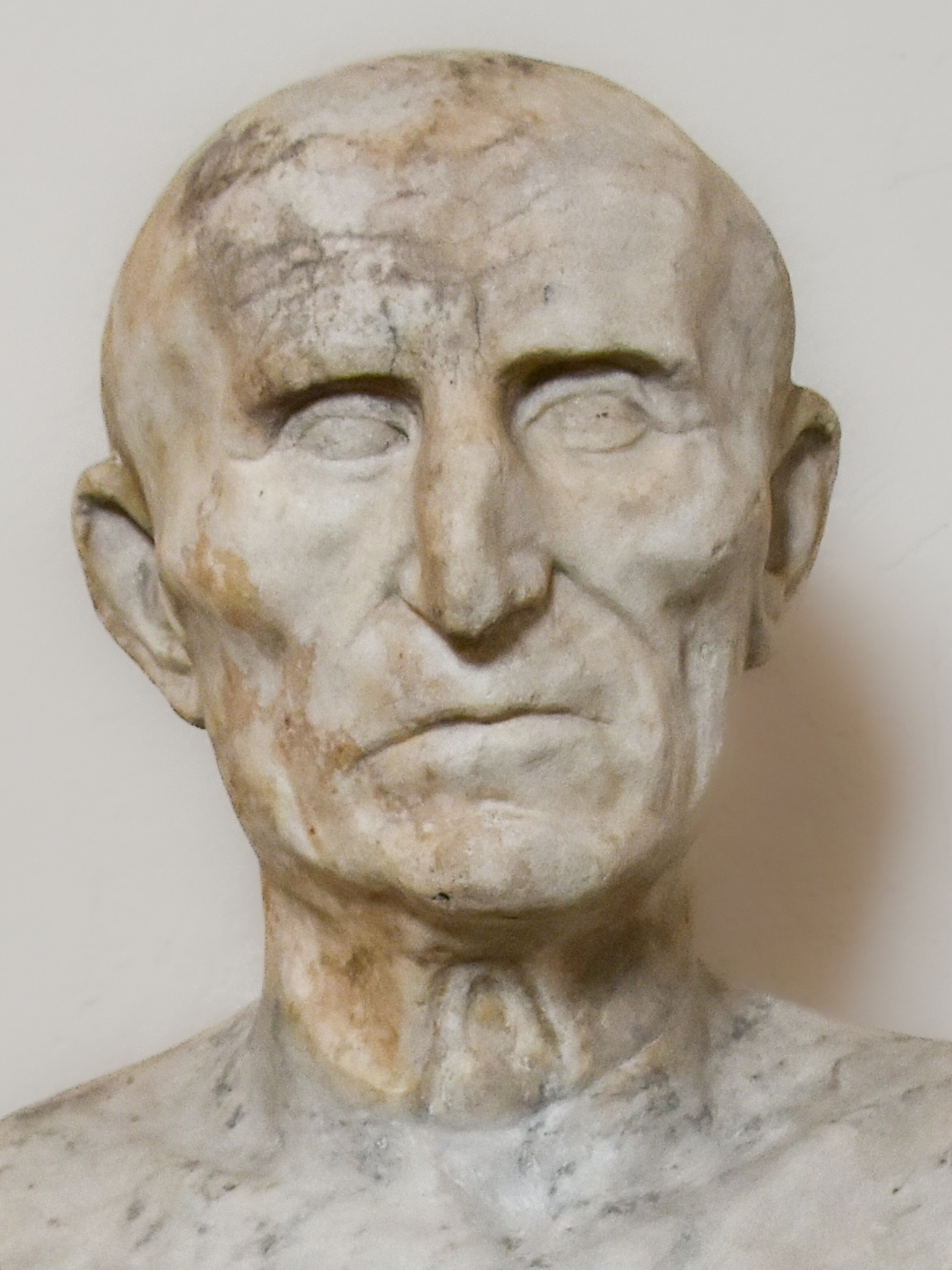
Galba

"Capax imperii nisi imperasset" is a Latin phrase written by Tacitus in Chapter 1.49 of his Histories.

Upon the death of Galba, Tacitus discusses Galba's life and character and ends Chapter 49 with this sentence: Maior privato visus dum privatus fuit, et omnium consensu capax imperii nisi imperasset ("He seemed too great to be a citizen so long as he was a citizen and all would have agreed that he was worthy to the imperial office, if he had never held it").

It has been said that the phrase is used by Tacitus to sum up Galba's character, as one who seemed to hold all the values of a good leader but failed when he became leader. In modern times, the phrase has been used to describe leaders who have failed to live up to their expectations. Rab Butler said it of Anthony Eden, Jeremy Paxman has quoted the phrase to describe Boris Johnson becoming prime minister, and it has also been used to describe Gordon Brown.

== See also ==
- List of Latin phrases
- Peter Principle
