= Publius Cornelius Scipio Asiaticus =

1st century AD Roman senator and suffect consul

Publius Cornelius Scipio Asiaticus was a Roman senator active during the Principate. He was suffect consul in the nundinium of September to December 68, as the colleague of Gaius Bellicius Natalis. Both Asiaticus and Bellicius Natalis were picked to be suffect consuls by emperor Galba.

Although it is not clear from his name, Asiaticus was a member of the Cornelii Lentuli, one of the patrician branches of the gens Cornelia. His father was Publius Cornelius Lentulus Scipio, suffect consul in 24, and his mother the beautiful Poppaea Sabina the Elder; his older half-brother was Publius Cornelius Scipio, suffect consul in 56. Asiaticus is the last known member of the Cornelii Lentuli.

Asiaticus owed the final element of his name to the fact he was born when his father was governor of Asia. This provides an important clue to the year of his birth. The older Scipio had been thought to have been governor in 36/37; however, Ronald Syme points to an inscription discovered in Lydia which indicates the date of Scipio's governorship falls in 41/2. The old date apparently is based on Asiaticus having been appointed consul at the earliest age permitted by the Lex Villia Annalis, which for a patrician is 32; however, based on the new evidence, Asiaticus acceded to the highest Republican magistracy as early as the age of 26. "That recalls the favour extended to nobiles in close propinquity to the dynasty," writes Syme, "and it may have encouraged forecasts about an impending choice of heir."

Asiaticus disappears from history after his consulate. The Year of the Four Emperors followed immediately upon his consulate, and Vitellius was notorious for having one of Asiaticus' cousins, Gnaeus Cornelius Dolabella, murdered partly because the emperor Galba had considered Dolabella as his successor; Asiaticus' similar closeness would have made him a similar risk. However, since our knowledge of the times is incomplete, anything from a premature death to a successful senatorial career and numerous children is equally possible.

Political offices
Preceded by Nero V, and ignotus as suffect consuls	Suffect consul of the Roman Empire; 68 with Gaius Bellicius Natalis	Succeeded by Galba II, and Titus Vinius as ordinary consuls
