= Mummia Achaica =

Mother of Roman emperor Galba

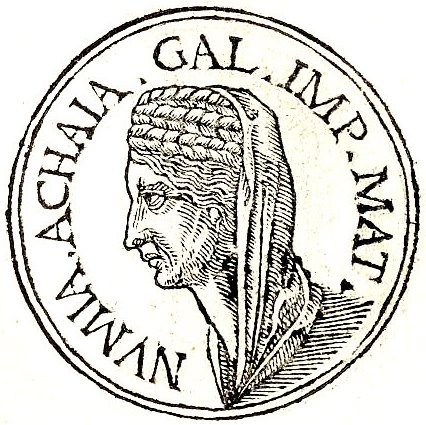
Mummia Achaica from Promptuarii Iconum Insigniorum

Mummia Achaica was the mother of the Roman Emperor Galba and his elder brother Gaius.

She was the granddaughter of the consul Quintus Lutatius Catulus Capitolinus through his daughter Lutatia. Her father's name was Lucius Mummius Achaicus, which made her a great-granddaughter of the general Lucius Mummius Achaicus.

She married Gaius Sulpicius Galba.

She died shortly after Galba's birth.
