= Lucius Calpurnius Piso Frugi Licinianus =

Roman senator (38–69)

Piso Licinianus
- Caesar of the Roman Empire
- Tenure: 10–15 January AD 69
- Born: AD 38
- Died: 15 January AD 69 (aged 31); Rome
Names
- Marcus Licinius Crassus Frugi (birth); Lucius Calpurnius Piso Frugi Licinianus
Regnal name
- Servius Sulpicius Galba Caesar
- Father: Marcus Licinius Crassus Frugi; Lucius Calpurnius Piso (adoptive); Servius Sulpicius Galba (adoptive)

Lucius Calpurnius Piso Frugi Licinianus (38–69) was a Roman nobleman who lived in the 1st century. His adoption by the Roman emperor Galba on 10 January 69 AD precipitated their joint murder by Otho, who had expected to be adopted instead. Otho then became the second emperor of the Year of the Four Emperors.

== Life ==
Licinianus was a nobleman of the highest ancient birth. Licinianus was one among the sons of Marcus Licinius Crassus Frugi (consul 27) and Scribonia. Licinianus was a member of the gens Licinia by birth. His name indicates he was adopted into the gens Calpurnia, probably by a relative of his brother-in-law Lucius Calpurnius Piso (consul 57).

His paternal grandfather was consul and governor Marcus Licinius Crassus (consul 14 BC). Crassus was the adoptive son of consul and general Marcus Licinius Crassus (consul 30 BC), the grandson of triumvir Marcus Licinius Crassus. He was the last known direct descendant of the triumvir and was the last known direct descendant of the triumvir who bore his name. Little is known of Licinianus’ life prior to his adoption by the Emperor Galba. He most probably was born and raised in Rome. His brother Gnaeus Pompeius Magnus was the first husband of Claudia Antonia, daughter of Emperor Claudius, and his other brother Marcus Licinius Crassus Frugi II was the great-great grandfather of Marcus Aurelius.

Licinianus was Galba's official heir from 10 January to 15 January 69, taking the dynastic name of "Servius Sulpicius Galba Caesar". He was appointed to strengthen Galba's position when two legions in Germania Superior rebelled against him in support of their commander Aulus Vitellius.

When the elderly Galba was choosing an heir his consul, Titus Vinius, proposed Otho, but Galba disapproved of Otho's lax morals, believing he would be little better than his predecessor, Nero. Instead he chose Licinianus, on the advice of his Praetorian prefect, Cornelius Laco. Suetonius describes him as a ‘handsome, well-bred young man’. Licinianus had enjoyed an excellent reputation for his integrity, uprightness and morality. Galba had called Licinianus ‘my son‘ and he had singled out Licinianus from the crowd at one of his morning receptions. Galba appointed Licinianus as heir to his name, the Roman throne and his property. Galba then led Licinianus to the camp of the Praetorian Guard, where Licinianus was formally and publicly adopted.

Otho had expected to be chosen. He was shocked and disappointed to hear about Galba's choice, Otho then decided to assassinate both men to become emperor. On January 15, Galba was hacked to death in the street by scores of soldiers. Vinius was also killed, despite shouting out that Otho had not ordered his death. Out of all the imperial bodyguards, only one centurion, Sempronius Densus, dared to stand against the assassins. Armed only with a dagger, he single-handedly confronted a large body of fully armed men and, by denouncing their mutiny and fighting them to the death, he bought Licinianus time to escape. Licinianus fled and hid in the temple of the Vestal Virgins.

There he should have been safe, but the assassins were in no mood to respect the sanctuary of the temple. He was discovered by two soldiers, Statius Murcus of the Praetorian Guard and Sulpicius Florus, a British auxiliary who had just been granted Roman citizenship by Galba. They dragged him outside and killed him. He was thirty-one years old.

Tacitus states that Otho 'studied the victim's severed head with peculiar malevolence, as if his eyes could never drink their fill'. Licinianus’ death was not enough; Otho also had Cornelius Laco killed.

One hundred and twenty people tried to claim the credit for killing Galba and Licinianus, expecting to be rewarded, and to this end a list was made of their names. However, when Otho was deposed by Vitellius the new emperor found the list and ordered them all executed.

Licinianus had married Verania Gemina, who came from a family of consular rank. Otho had afterwards surrendered Licinianus’ head to Verania, who had given Otho a large sum of money for it. Verania had buried Licinianus' head together with his body in a tomb located on the Via Salaria. It appears that Verania and Licinianus had no children. According to Tacitus Licinianus' will was respected because of his relative poverty.

== See also ==
- Licinia gens

== Sources ==
- Smith, William, ed. (1870). Dictionary of Greek and Roman Biography and Mythology. Vol. 3. p. 378. Archived from the original on 6 September 2007.
- Smith, William, ed. (1870). Dictionary of Greek and Roman Biography and Mythology. Vol. 3. p. 758. Archived from the original on 15 March 2009.
- Smith, William, ed. (1870). Dictionary of Greek and Roman Biography and Mythology. Vol. 3. p. 1239. Archived from the original on 31 December 2005.
- Suetonius, On the Life of the Caesars, Galba & Otho
- Tacitus, The Histories, Book I (Penguin Classics, 2009)
- Lanciani, Rodolfo (1892). "Pagan Cemeteries". Pagan and Christian Rome. Houghton, Mifflin and Company.
