= Lucius Verginius Rufus =

Roman military officer, consul and provincial governor (AD 15–97)

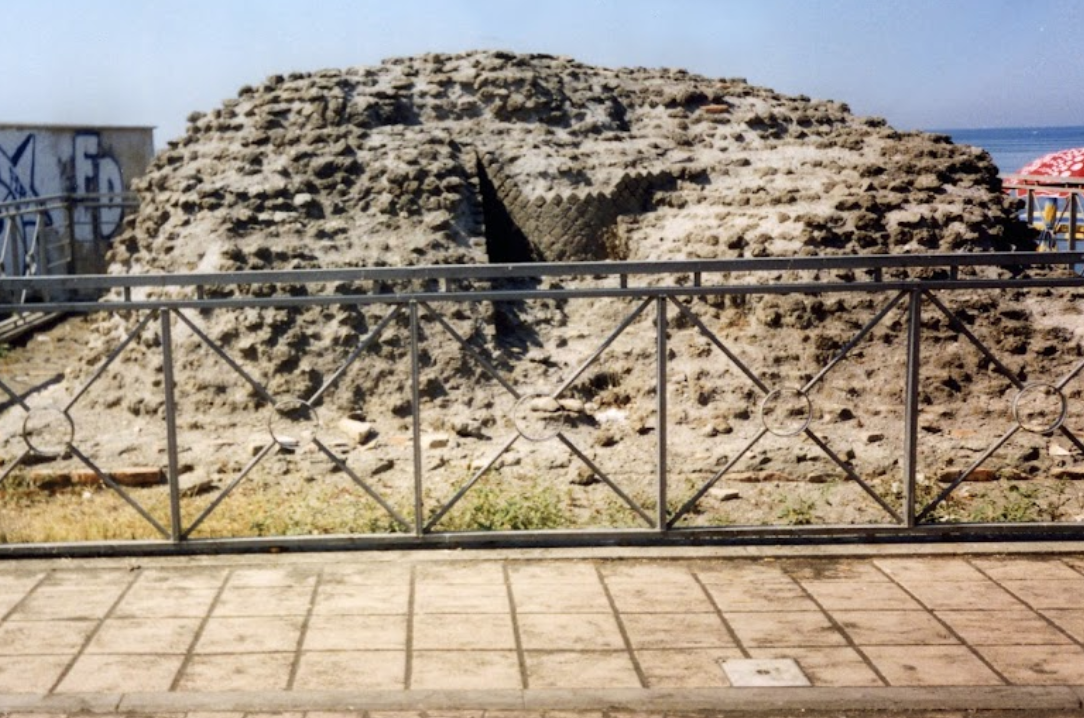
Tomb of Lucius Verginius Rufus, Ladispoli

Lucius Verginius Rufus (AD 15–97; sometimes incorrectly called Lucius Virginus Rufus) was a Roman commander of Germania Superior during the late 1st century. He was three times consul (in 63, 69, and 97). He was born near Comum, the birthplace of both Pliny the Elder and Pliny the Younger.

Verginius Rufus was born in Northern Italy as a member of an equestrian family. He became consul in 63 under the emperor Nero. After his consulship, Verginius Rufus was made governor of Germania Superior.

When Gaius Iulius Vindex revolted against Nero in 67, Verginius Rufus led an army against him and defeated the rebel in 68 near modern-day Besançon.

After Nero's fall, the legions under Verginius Rufus hailed him as emperor in preference to Servius Sulpicius Galba (Vindex' ally), but Verginius Rufus refused to accept the purple. After the death of Otho in April 69, the soldiers again offered the throne to Verginius, but he again refused it. Verginius retreated to an estate at Alsium on the coast of Etruria northwest of Rome. There he studied, composed poems, and had a literary salon.

After the murder of Emperor Domitian, Marcus Cocceius Nerva was elected emperor by the senate. Nerva chose as his co-consul for 97 the elderly Verginius Rufus, who was enticed out of retirement. However, when Verginius Rufus was to hold a speech, he dropped a book he was carrying, and while bending down to pick it up, slipped and broke his hip. He died not long afterward at the age of 82 and was given a state funeral.

At the public burial with which he was honored, the historian Tacitus (then consul) delivered the funeral oration. Pliny the Younger, his neighbor and ward, has recorded the lines which Verginius had ordered to be engraved upon his tomb: Hic situs est Rufus, pulso qui Vindice quondam Imperium adseruit non sibi, sed patriae ("Here lies Rufus, who many years ago defeated Vindex and laid claim to power not for himself, but for his fatherland").

The remains of his tomb are in Ladispoli, and the nearby Roman villa may have been his.

== See also ==
- Verginia gens

Political offices
Preceded by Quintus Junius Marullus, and Titus Clodius Eprius Marcellus as suffect consuls	Consul of the Roman Empire; 63 with Gaius Memmius Regulus	Succeeded by Titus Petronius Niger, and Quintus Manlius Tarquitius Saturninus as suffect consuls
Preceded by Marcus Otho Caesar Augustus, and Lucius Salvius Otho Titianus II	Suffect Consul of the Roman Empire; 69 with Lucius Pompeius Vopiscus	Succeeded by Gnaeus Arulenus Caelius Sabinus, and Titus Flavius Sabinus
Preceded by Tiberius Catius Caesius Fronto, and Marcus Calpurnius [...]icus as suffect consuls	Consul of the Roman Empire; 97 with Marcus Cocceius Nerva III	Succeeded by Gnaeus Arrius Antoninus II, and Gaius Calpurnius Piso as suffect consuls
