= Gaius Memmius Regulus =

First century AD Roman senator and consul

Gaius Memmius Regulus was a first-century Roman senator. He was ordinary consul in AD 63, with Lucius Verginius Rufus as his colleague.

== Background and family ==
Regulus was the son of Publius Memmius Regulus, consul suffectus in AD 31. His grandfather, Publius Memmius Regulus, had married a woman from Ruscino, in the province of Gallia Narbonensis. Although the year of his birth is uncertain, Regulus was born during the second half of the reign of the emperor Tiberius. His father was governor of Achaea in AD 35, and both father and son were honored with various statues.

== Political career ==
Regulus was appointed consul ordinarius in AD 63, during the reign of Nero. His colleague was Lucius Verginius Rufus. They served a full six months, from the Kalends of January to the Kalends of July. Regulus' father had died two years earlier, and did not live to see his son reach the pinnacle of his career. After his consulship, Regulus joined the priesthood of the Sodales Augustales, and later the Sodales Claudialium.

== See also ==
- Memmia gens

== Bibliography ==
- Gaius Plinius Secundus (Pliny the Elder), Historia Naturalis (Natural History).
- Publius Cornelius Tacitus, Annales.
- Gaius Suetonius Tranquillus, De Vita Caesarum (Lives of the Caesars, or The Twelve Caesars).
- Lucius Cassius Dio Cocceianus (Cassius Dio), Roman History.
- Dictionary of Greek and Roman Biography and Mythology, William Smith, ed., Little, Brown and Company, Boston (1849).
- Theodor Mommsen et alii, Corpus Inscriptionum Latinarum (The Body of Latin Inscriptions, abbreviated CIL), Berlin-Brandenburgische Akademie der Wissenschaften (1853–present).
- Paul A. Gallivan, "Some Comments on the Fasti for the Reign of Nero", in Classical Quarterly, vol. 24, pp. 290–311 (1974).
- Der Neue Pauly: Enzyklopädie der Antike. Das klassische Altertum und seine Rezeptionsgeschichte, Hubert Cancik, Helmuth Schneider, eds., J. B. Metzler, Stuttgart (1996–2012).

Political offices
Preceded by Quintus Junius Marullus, and Titus Clodius Eprius Marcellus	Consul of the Roman Empire; 63 with Lucius Verginius Rufus	Succeeded by Titus Petronius Niger, and Quintus Manlius Tarquitius Saturninus
