= Gaius Julius Vindex =

Roman senator and governor (AD c. 25–68)

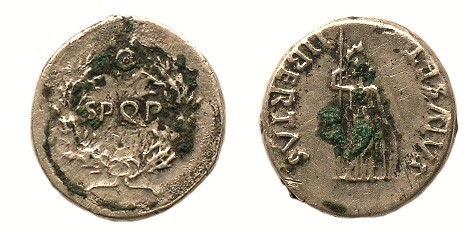
A forged denarius of Vindex, minted in AD 68, around the time of his rebellion

Gaius Julius Vindex (c. AD 25 – 68) was a Roman governor in the province of Gallia Lugdunensis.

== Biography ==
Following normal Roman procedures, his name Gaius Julius indicated that his family had likely been given citizenship under Gaius Julius Caesar, or perhaps Emperor Augustus or Caligula. He was of a noble Gallic family of Aquitania (given senatorial status under Claudius) and was one of the men belonging to a faction of Empress Agrippina, the mother of Nero.

Vindex had taken part in a conspiracy against the emperor in 59.

=== Vindex Rebellion ===
In either late 67 or early 68, Vindex rebelled against Emperor Nero. Though the aims of his followers may have been more complex, Vindex, as a senator, probably had the aim simply of replacing Nero with a better emperor and ending the tyranny that plagued the empire.

=== Rise of Emperor Galba ===
According to the historian Cassius Dio, Vindex "was powerful in body and of shrewd intelligence, was skilled in warfare and full of daring for any great enterprise; and he had a passionate love of freedom and a vast ambition". In order to gain support, he declared his allegiance to the then governor of Hispania Tarraconensis, Servius Sulpicius Galba. By June 68, military support for Galba eventually led to Nero's suicide. Galba, acclaimed by the Senate, struck coins to commemorate Vindex, to whom he owed his position as emperor.

=== Battle of Vesontio ===
The commander of the army from Germania Superior, governor Lucius Verginius Rufus, advanced against him. The Battle of Vesontio (68) took place near Vesontio (modern Besançon). What occurred then is unclear, but, despite a meeting between Verginius and Vindex, the forces under Verginius appear to have decided on a battle without orders. Desire for plunder and the weakness of Verginius as a commander are possible explanations. Vindex was defeated in the resulting battle and subsequently killed himself.
