= Gaius Sulpicius Galba (consul AD 22) =

Roman senator active during the reign of Tiberius

Gaius Sulpicius Galba (died 36) was a Roman senator who was active during the reign of Tiberius. He was consul in AD 22 as the colleague of Decimus Haterius Agrippa. Sulpicius Galba was the son of Gaius Sulpicius Galba and Mummia Achaica, grandson of Quintus Lutatius Catulus; the future emperor Galba was his brother.

Over his lifetime Gaius squandered the larger portion of his estate, and was forced to retire from Rome. He hoped to recover his wealth through the sortition of 36, which had given him either Africa or Asia to govern as proconsul, but the emperor Tiberius forbade him from taking up the province awarded him. This forced Gaius to end his life.

Political offices
Preceded by Mamercus Aemilius Scaurus; Gnaeus Tremellius as suffect consuls	Roman consul 22 with Decimus Haterius Agrippa	Succeeded by Gaius Asinius Pollio; Gaius Antistius Vetus as ordinary consuls
