= Sempronius Densus =

1st century Roman centurion in the Praetorian Guard

- Died: January 15, 69; Rome, Roman Empire
- Allegiance: Roman Empire
- Service / branch: Praetorian Guard
- Rank: Centurion

Sempronius Densus was a centurion in the Praetorian Guard in the 1st century. He was bodyguard to the emperor's heir, Piso Licinianus, and is remembered by history for his courage and loyalty in singlehandedly defending his charge from scores of armed assassins, while all his comrades deserted or switched sides.

== Conspiracy ==
On January 10, 69 CE, Emperor Galba chose a man to become his deputy and heir. One of Galba's advisors had led Marcus Salvius Otho to expect to be appointed to this office, but instead Galba chose Piso Licinianus. This unexpected choice led Otho to conspire to assassinate both of them and seize power.

== Assassination and death ==
On January 15 Otho struck. Galba and Piso were being carried on litters through the street when they were accosted by a large company of renegade Praetorians in Otho's employ. The Praetorians were supposed to be the personal bodyguard of the emperor, but now they intended his death. Of all the soldiers present, only Sempronius Densus, who had been assigned by Galba to guard Piso, stood firm, while his colleagues either joined in the murder or melted away. While Piso fled to seek a safe hiding place, Sempronius bought him time to escape, first remonstrating with the assassins and then fighting them to the death.

At this point sources differ slightly. According to Plutarch, Sempronius gave his life defending both Galba and Piso:

No man resisted or offered to stand up in his defence, save one only, a centurion, Sempronius Densus, the single man among so many thousands that the sun beheld that day act worthily of the Roman empire, who, though he had never received any favour from Galba, yet out of bravery and allegiance endeavoured to defend the litter. First, lifting up his switch of vine, with which the centurions correct the soldiers when disorderly, he called aloud to the aggressors, charging them not to touch their emperor. And when they came upon him hand-to-hand, he drew his sword, and made a defence for a long time, until at last he was cut under the knees and brought to the ground.

After Sempronius finally fell, the assassins surrounded Galba and killed him.

Tacitus however describes Galba's death as occurring first in the order of events, followed by the centurion's last stand, in which Sempronius uses a pugio.

Dio Cassius simply relates:

Sempronius Densus, a centurion, defended him as long as he could, and finally, when he could accomplish nothing, let himself be slain over Galba's body.

Suetonious entirely omits the death of Sempronius from his accounts on the deaths of Galba and Piso.

== Outcome ==
However, all of the sources agree on what happened next. While most of the assassins hacked Galba's corpse to pieces and paraded his severed head on a pole, two of them sought out Piso, who had taken refuge in the Temple of Vesta. They dragged him outside and killed him at the door.

Around 120 people later claimed credit for killing Galba and Piso, hoping that Otho would reward them. However, in April that year Otho was deposed by Vitellius, who replaced him as emperor. Vitellius found the list of their names and ordered them all executed. He also disbanded the Praetorian Guard (although the Guard was reinstated by the next emperor, Vespasian).

Although ultimately unsuccessful, Sempronius Densus's last stand is recorded by historians as being the only heroic act done in Rome that day.

This is why I have recorded his name, for he is most worthy of being mentioned. — Dio Cassius.
