= Battle of Vesontio (68) =

Battle in 68 AD

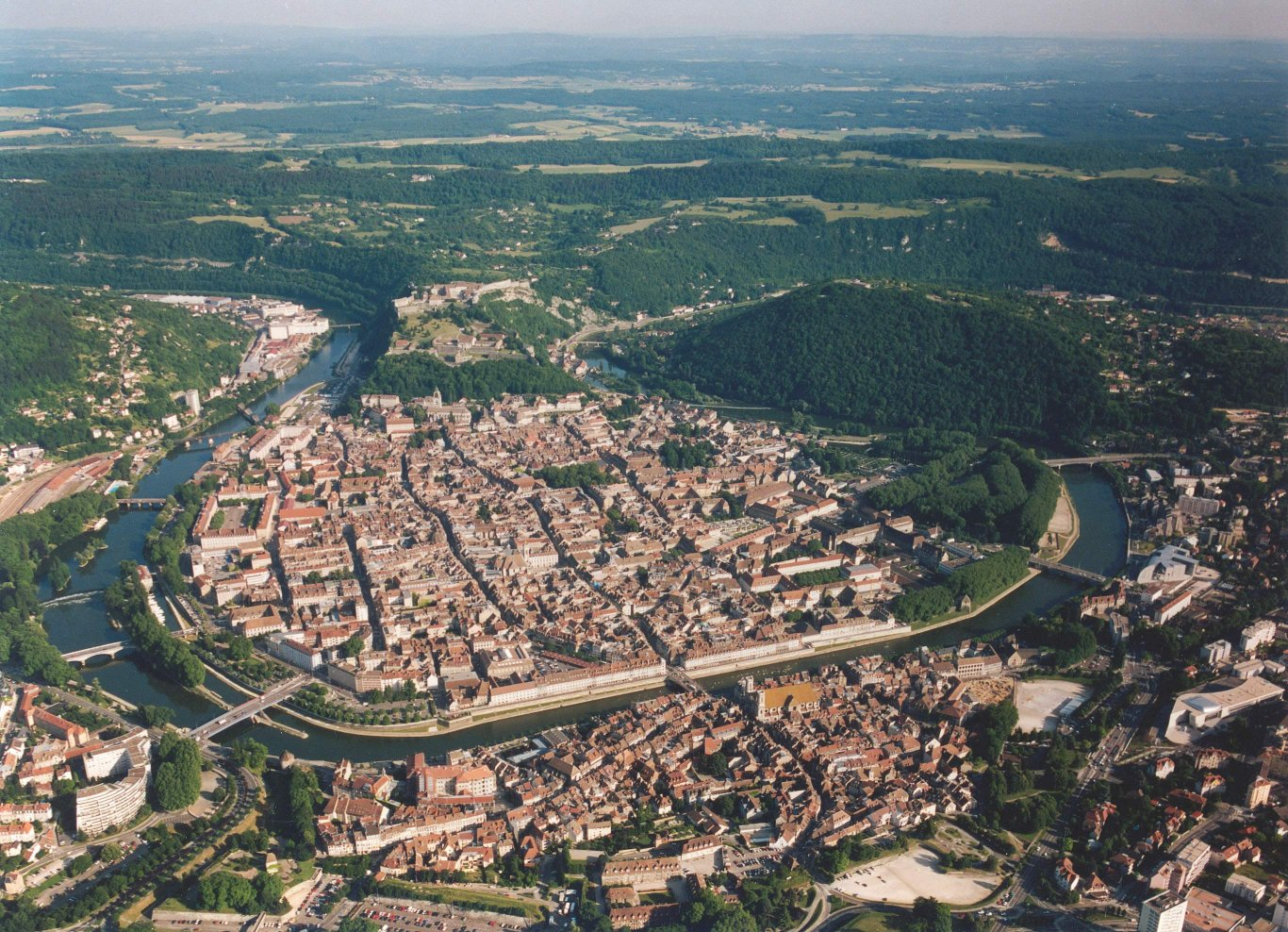
Besançon city

The Battle of Vesontio was a conflict in 68 AD in which Lucius Verginius Rufus defeated Gaius Julius Vindex. Vindex had rebelled against the Emperor Nero and declared his allegiance to Galba. Verginius advanced against him and a battle between their two forces took place near Vesontio (modern Besançon). What occurred then is unclear, but, despite a meeting between Verginius and Vindex, the forces under Verginius seem to have decided on a battle without orders. Desire for plunder and the weakness of Verginius as a commander are possible explanations. Vindex was defeated in the resulting battle and subsequently committed suicide.
