= Icelus Martianus =

1st century CE Roman freedman, adviser to Galba

- Died: 69 AD
- Cause of death: Public execution
- Citizenship: Roman
- Occupation: Knight
- Years active: 68 AD – 69 AD
- Known for: adviser to Galba
- Opponents: Titus Vinius; Cornelius Laco

Icelus Martianus or Marcianus (died 69 AD) was a freedman of and adviser to the Roman Emperor Galba. Icelus had been imprisoned and released during the revolt against Nero and was present at Nero's suicide, where he granted Nero's request that his body be buried intact. When Icelus brought news of Nero's death to Galba, he showered him with kisses; Suetonius suggests that Icelus was a homosexual lover of Galba. Icelus was given the name Martianus and elevated to the rank of knight by Galba. This was contrary to the Tiberian law which stipulated that no freedman could be elevated to equestrian rank without first having three previous generations of free birth.

Icelus rivaled Titus Vinius and Cornelius Laco for influence over Galba, who executed numerous Roman citizens without trial. Icelus, along with Laco, opposed the adoption of Otho by Galba. After Galba was deposed, Icelus was publicly executed by Otho, who accused Icelus of theft of public funds.
