= Titus Vinius =

Roman general and consul (AD 12–69)

Titus Vinius (12 – 69) was a Roman general and one of the most powerful men in Rome during the reign of the Emperor Galba.

== Stories ==
Plutarch recounts several stories about Vinius' early life, all casting him in a negative light. According to one account, during his first military campaign, he smuggled his commander's wife into the camp at night disguised as a soldier and had sexual relations with her in the general's quarters. As a result, he was imprisoned by Emperor Caligula, but was released following Caligula's death.

Later on, again according to Plutarch and Tacitus, when he was invited to supper by the emperor Claudius he stole a gold drinking cup. Claudius was told of this, and invited him to supper again the following evening. When Vinius came, Claudius made his point by having his attendants set earthenware plates before him instead of silver. Nevertheless, Tacitus, who elsewhere describes him as "the most worthless of mankind", says that as proconsul of Gallia Narbonensis he administered the province with strict integrity.

== As consul ==
Vinius was commander of one of the legions in Hispania when Galba was governor there. When Galba was proclaimed emperor in 68, Vinius accompanied him to Rome, where Galba chose him to be his colleague as consul. Vinius quickly came to have great influence—indeed, it was said that he and two others, Cornelius Laco, the commander of the Praetorian Guard, and Galba's freedman Icelus Martianus, virtually controlled the emperor. The three were called "the three pedagogues" because of their influence on Galba. Tacitus writes that Vinius' "unpopularity grew every day along with his power". According to Suetonius and Plutarch, Vinius was exceedingly greedy for money, prepared to do anything in return for a bribe. In particular, he protected Tigellinus, who was blamed for having corrupted Nero, from retribution in exchange for a large bribe.

== Support for Otho, and death ==
In early 69 Galba was faced with the need to designate an heir. Titus Vinius supported Otho, having already secretly agreed that Otho should marry his daughter Crispina. Galba, however, for once refused to follow Vinius' advice and instead selected Piso Licinianus as his adopted son and designated heir. Otho responded by persuading the Praetorian guard to proclaim him emperor instead of Galba. With turmoil in the streets, Titus Vinius advised Galba to remain in the palace and to arm the slaves in the palace to help defend it. Laco and Icelus, however, advised Galba to go out and show himself. Galba followed their advice, and was killed by the Praetorians. Vinius tried to run away, calling out that Otho had not ordered him killed, but was pierced from one side to the other with a sword by a legionary.

Political offices
Preceded by Gaius Bellicius Natalis, and Publius Cornelius Scipio Asiaticus as Suffect consuls	Consul of the Roman Empire; 69 with Galba	Succeeded by Otho II, and Lucius Salvius Otho Titianus II
