= Obultronius Sabinus =

Obultronius Sabinus was quaestor aerarii in 56 or 57 AD: the quaestor aerarii fulfilled the role of paymaster militaria.

It is accounted to by the writer Tacitus, that a tribune of the people named Helvidius Priscus brought an action against Obultronius Sabinus. The accusation was harassment for the purposes of unreasonable confiscations. The decision of the Emperor, at that time Nero, was to transfer the responsibility of the task of acquiring the assets of others instead to prefects who had been entrusted especially with the afore-mentioned civic duty.
