= Cornelius Laco =

Roman Praetorian prefect from 68 to 69

- Born: Rome
- Died: 69 AD; Rome
- Military career
- Allegiance: Roman Empire
- Service years: 68–15 January 69
- Rank: Praetorian prefect
- Commands: Praetorian Guard

Cornelius Laco (died AD 69) was a prefect of the Roman vigiles (praefectus vigilum) under Claudius, and later of the Praetorian Guard (praefectus praetorio) under Emperor Galba, from 68 until Galba's death on 15 January of AD 69. Laco acceded to this office upon the suicide of the previous emperor Nero, replacing Gaius Ophonius Tigellinus as head of the Guard.

Galba's rule proved to be short lived, however. His advanced age had destroyed his energy, and he was entirely in the hands of favorites. Laco, together with Titus Vinius, who became Galba's colleague as consul, and Galba's freedman Icelus Martianus, were said to virtually control the emperor, even being called "the three pedagogues" because of their influence on him. This made the new emperor gravely unpopular, and on January 15 69, Marcus Salvius Otho was proclaimed Emperor in his place. Galba was assassinated; Laco was banished to an island, where he was later murdered by soldiers of Otho.
