= Marcus Licinius Crassus Frugi (consul 27) =

1st century AD Roman senator, consul and governor of Mauretania

- Died: 47 AD
- Cause of death: Executed by order of Empress Messalina
- Occupations: Roman consul, Roman governor
- Spouse: Scribonia Magna
- Children: Gnaeus Pompeius Magnus; Marcus Licinius Crassus Frugi; Marcus Licinius Crassus Scribonianus; Lucius Calpurnius Piso Licinianus; Licinia Magna
- Parent: Marcus Licinius Crassus Frugi (father)

Marcus Licinius Crassus Frugi (flourished 1st century AD) was a Roman nobleman of consular rank who lived during the Roman Empire. Frugi's mother was an unnamed Roman woman, while his father was consul and governor Marcus Licinius Crassus Frugi. Frugi's adoptive paternal grandfather was consul and general Marcus Licinius Crassus the Younger. Crassus was the grandson of triumvir Marcus Licinius Crassus and the last known direct descendant of his grandfather. He had a daughter called Licinia who married the consul Lucius Calpurnius Piso; their son, Gaius Calpurnius Piso, was a conspirator against the Emperor Nero.

== Life ==
His career as a public figure has been preserved in an inscription preserved at Rome. Frugi served as an urban praetor, then in 27 as ordinary consul with Lucius Calpurnius Piso as his colleague. Sometime after 44, he served as governor of Mauretania. He was also admitted to the Collegium Pontificum, one of the four most prestigious ancient Roman priesthoods.

When the Emperor Claudius left Rome to complete the conquest of Britain, in the words of Barbara Levick Frugi was one of a "galaxy of consular distinguished for high pretensions or military talent" who accompanied him, thus sharing "the glory -- and were kept from mischief in Rome". When Claudius celebrated his victory upon his return to Rome in 43 with a triumph, Frugi was included. On this occasion, Claudius exempted Frugi from wearing a purple-bordered toga (he had earned the same honour on a previous occasion). Frugi came dressed to the parade in a palm-embroidered tunic and rode a caparisoned charger.

== Family ==
Frugi had married a noblewoman called Scribonia. Scribonia was a direct descendant of Pompeia, the daughter of triumvir Pompey from his third marriage to Mucia Tertia.

Scribonia bore Frugi the following children:

- A son, Gnaeus Pompeius Magnus. He married the princess Claudia Antonia in 43, the daughter and only child of Claudius from his second marriage to Aelia Paetina. Antonia married him as her first husband and they had no children. Magnus was murdered in 47.
- A son, Marcus Licinius Crassus Frugi. He served as consul in 64 under Emperor Nero. Nero had Frugi executed between 66 and 68, because of information brought against him by Marcus Aquilius Regulus. After his death, his widow Sulpicia Praetextata appeared in 70 at a meeting of the Senate, seeking vengeance for Frugi's death. This led to the Senate's prosecution of Regulus, along with his associated political circle. With Sulpicia Praetextata, Frugi had three sons and a daughter: Lucius Scribonius Libo Rupilius Frugi Bonus (consul in 88), Marcus Licinius Scribonianus Camerinus, and Gaius Calpurnius Piso Crassus Frugi Licinianus (consul in 87); the daughter was Licinia Praetextata, who served as a Chief Vestal Virgin.
- A son, Marcus Licinius Crassus Scribonianus. Sometime between 68 and 69 the general Marcus Antonius Primus had offered to make Scribonianus Emperor, but Scribonianus declined. Tacitus indicates that he was murdered at some point after the death of his younger brother Licinianus.
- A son, Lucius Calpurnius Piso Frugi Licinianus, who was adopted by a member of the Calpurnia gens. He was later adopted by the brief emperor Galba (r. 68–69). Licinianus became Galba's son and heir, but was murdered on the orders of Otho, another aspirant to the throne. Licinianus married a woman called Verania Gemina, who came from a family of consular rank.
- A daughter, Licinia Magna. She married the Senator Lucius Calpurnius Piso, who served as one of the consuls in 57. Piso was later killed on the orders of Emperor Vespasian. Licinia and Piso had a daughter called Calpurnia, who married Calpurnius Piso Galerianus, son of Gaius Calpurnius Piso (co-consul in 41 with Claudius). Calpurnius Piso Galerianus was executed in 70 for opposing Vespasian. Licinia died at an unknown date between 70 and 80, as her grave altar, found on the grounds of Villa Bonaparte near the Porta Salaria, is dated from this period. The land may have been part of the family's suburban estates and her grave altar is now on display at the Vatican Museums.

In the spring of 47, Frugi, his wife, and Gnaeus Pompeius Magnus were executed on the orders of Empress Valeria Messalina, after which, their remains were placed in the tomb of Licinii Calpurnii located on the Via Salaria. Also interred in the tomb was their son, Marcus Licinius Crassus Frugi minor.

== See also ==
- Licinia gens
- Lucius Calpurnius Piso Frugi

== Bibliography ==
- Suetonius, The Lives of the Twelve Caesars, "Claudius", Ch. 17
- Tacitus, Annals
- Tacitus, The Histories, Penguin Classics, 2009
- http://penelope.uchicago.edu/Thayer/E/Gazetteer/Places/Europe/Italy/Lazio/Roma/Rome/_Texts/Lanciani/LANPAC/6*.html
- R. Syme, The Roman Revolution (Oxford: University Press, 2002)
- S.H. Rutledge, Imperial Inquisitions: Prosecutors and Informants from Tiberius to Domitian (Google eBook), Routledge, 2002
- J. Elsner & J. Huskinson, Life, Death and Representation: Some New Work on Roman Sarcophagi (Google eBook), Walter de Gruyter, 2010
- V. Rudich, Political Dissidence Under Nero: The Price of Dissimulation, Routledge, 2013
- J. Shelton, The Women of Pliny's Letters, Routledge, 2013

Political offices
Preceded by Q. Junius Blaesus; L. Antistius Vetus as suffecti	Consul of the Roman Empire; 27 with Lucius Calpurnius Piso	Succeeded by P. Cornelius Lentulus; C. Sallustius Crispus Passienus as suffecti
