= Scribonia (wife of Crassus) =

1st century AD Roman noblewoman

Scribonia Magna (fl. 1st century), known in modern historical sources as Scribonia Crassi, was a Roman noblewoman. Scribonia was descended from Pompey.

== Biography ==
Scribonia was born before 16, as in that year her father was executed on a charge of conspiracy against the Roman emperor Tiberius. Scribonia was born and raised in Rome. Very little is known of her life.

Scribonia married Marcus Licinius Crassus Frugi, a man of consular rank. Frugi's father, consul and governor Marcus Licinius Crassus, was the adopted son of consul and general Marcus Licinius Crassus the grandson of triumvir Marcus Licinius Crassus. He was the last known direct descendant of the triumvir who bore his name.

== Children and descendants ==
Scribonia bore Frugi the following children:

- Son, Gnaeus Pompeius Magnus. In 43 he married Claudia Antonia, only child of Roman emperor Claudius from his second marriage to Aelia Paetina. Magnus was murdered in 47.
- Son, Marcus Licinius Crassus Frugi. He served as consul in 64 under emperor Nero. The wife of Frugi was Sulpicia Praetextata, daughter of the suffect consul in 46, Quintus Sulpicius Camerinus Peticus. Nero had Frugi executed between 66 and 68, because of information brought against him by Marcus Aquilius Regulus. In the year 70, early in the reign of Vespasian, Praetextata and her children went to a Roman Senate meeting seeking vengeance for Frugi's death. Regulus and his associated political circle were prosecuted by the Senate. With Sulpicia Praetextata, Frugi had four children:
  - Daughter, Licinia Praetextata, who served as a Chief Vestal Virgin.
  - Son, Lucius Scribonius Libo Rupilius Frugi Bonus, who served as a suffect consul in 88,
  - Son, Marcus Licinius Scribonianus Camerinus, and
  - Son, Gaius Calpurnius Piso Crassus Frugi Licinianus, who served as a consul in 87.
- Son, Marcus Licinius Crassus Scribonianus. Sometime between 68 and 69 the general Marcus Antonius Primus, had offered Scribonianus the position of Roman emperor; however Scribonianus refused to accept this.
- Son, Lucius Calpurnius Piso Frugi Licinianus or Lucius Calpurnius Piso Licinianus (38-69). Licinianus was adopted by the brief Roman emperor Galba, who reigned between 68 and 69. As Galba's heir, Licinianus was murdered when Otho seized the throne. Licinianus married a Roman woman called Verania Germina, who came from a family of consular rank.
- Daughter, Licinia Magna. She married the Senator Lucius Calpurnius Piso, who served as one of the consuls in 57. Piso was later killed by Roman emperor Vespasian as an enemy of the emperor. Licinia died at an unknown date from 70 until 80 as her grave altar is dated from this period, which was found on the grounds of Villa Bonaparte near the Porta Salaria. The land may have been part of the family's suburban estates and her grave altar is on display at the Vatican Museums. Licinia and Piso had one child:
  - Daughter, Calpurnia, who married Calpurnius Piso Galerianus, son of Gaius Calpurnius Piso (co-consul in 41 with Claudius). Calpurnius Piso Galerianus was executed in 70 for opposing Vespasian.

== Death ==
In the spring of 47 Scribonia, her husband and Gnaeus Pompeius Magnus were executed on the orders of Roman empress Valeria Messalina. After Scribonia, her husband and her son had died, the three were placed in the tomb of Licinii Calpurnii that is located on the Via Salaria. Also placed in the tomb was their son, Marcus Licinius Crassus Frugi II.

== Other sources ==
- Romeins Imperium – Marcus Licinius Crassus Frugi translated from Dutch to English
- Anne Publie. "Les Cneuius". & Anne Publie. "Les Caesoninus"
- Suetonius - The Lives of the Twelves Caesars - Caligula & Claudius
- http://penelope.uchicago.edu/Thayer/E/Gazetteer/Places/Europe/Italy/Lazio/Roma/Rome/_Texts/Lanciani/LANPAC/6*.html
- R. Syme, The Roman Revolution, Oxford University Press, 2002
- S.H. Rutledge, Imperial Inquisitions: Prosecutors and Informants from Tiberius to Domitian (Google eBook), Routledge, 2002
- J. Elsner & J. Huskinson, Life, Death and Representation: Some New Work on Roman Sarcophagi (Google eBook), Walter de Gruyter, 2010
- V. Rudich, Political Dissidence Under Nero: The Price of Dissimulation, Routledge, 2013
- J. Shelton, The Women of Pliny's Letters, Routledge, 2013
