= Licinia =

Ancient Roman nomen

Licinia is the name used by ancient Roman women of the gens Licinia.

== Known individuals ==
=== Daughter of Gaius Licinius Varus ===
Licinia (flourished 188 BC–180 BC) was the daughter of Gaius Licinius Varus and the sister of Publius Licinius Crassus (consul 171 BC) and Gaius Licinius Crassus (consul 168 BC). She married Publius Mucius Scaevola (consul 175 BC) and bore him at least two sons Publius Mucius Scaevola and Publius Licinius Crassus Dives Mucianus. The younger son was adopted by her elder brother as his heir. Both sons were well-educated and both became Pontifex Maximus successively.

=== Wife of Claudius Asellus ===
Licinia (died 153 BC), a woman killed by her relatives in 153 BC for allegedly murdering her husband Claudius Asellus; another woman similarly accused was Publicia, wife of the consul Lucius Postumius Albinus (consul 154 BC). Both women assigned real estate as bail to the urban praetor, but were killed (strangled) by their relatives before coming to trial.

=== Daughters of Publius Licinius Crassus Dives Mucianus ===
Two daughters of Publius Licinius Crassus Dives Mucianus (consul and Pontifex Maximus) by his wife Claudia, sister of Appius Claudius Pulcher:

- Licinia Major (flourished 2nd century BC), was married to Gaius Sulpicius Galba.
- Licinia Minor (flourished 2nd century BC), also known as Licinia Crassi. A younger daughter, she was the wife of Gaius Gracchus. Her dowry was seized temporarily by the Senate when her husband's property was confiscated, but eventually restored after an appeal to her uncle Publius Mucius Scaevola the Pontifex Maximus. (Note: Plutarch is wrong in believing that Licinia lost her dowry permanently; what was confiscated was her husband's property, and she had to sue to reclaim her dowry. The suit also definitely establishes Gracchus's wife's name as Licinia.)

=== Daughter of Lucius Licinius Crassus ===
Two daughters of Lucius Licinius Crassus and his wife Laelia Minor, herself a daughter of Gaius Laelius Sapiens (consul in 140 BC). Both sisters and their mother were known for their pure Latin.

- Licinia Major the elder daughter of Lucius Licinius Crassus and his wife Laelia, she was married to Publius Cornelius Scipio Nasica, son of the consul of 111 BC and grandson of Publius Cornelius Scipio Nasica Serapio, consul in 138 BC and Pontifex Maximus. She had at least two surviving sons, of whom the elder was adopted by her father as his heir Lucius Licinius Crassus Scipio and the younger was adopted by her husband's cousin Quintus Caecilius Metellus Pius, a close friend of dictator Lucius Cornelius Sulla. This son is known to history as Metellus Scipio (see Caecilius Metellus) - Caesar's ineffectual military and political rival and Pompey's last father-in-law. His daughter was Cornelia Metella.
- Licinia Minor the other daughter of Lucius Licinius Crassus and his wife Laelia. She was married to Gaius Marius the Younger, according to both Plutarch and Cicero.

=== Wife of Quintus Mucius Scaevola Pontifex ===
Licinia Crassa (flourished 2nd century BC & 1st century BC), noted for her beauty; the wife firstly of Quintus Mucius Scaevola, a future consul and Pontifex Maximus, who became notorious for her adultery with another consul Quintus Caecilius Metellus Nepos. Metellus Nepos divorced his wife to marry Licinia a week later, after she had been divorced by her husband and thus disgraced in Roman society. The couple later had two sons, both of them consuls. By her first husband, she was also mother of Mucia Tertia, triumvir Pompey's third wife.

=== Daughter of Marcus Licinius Crassus ===
Licinia (flourished 1st century BC & 1st century) was a daughter of the consul in 14 BC and governor Marcus Licinius Crassus and sister of Roman Senator Marcus Licinius Crassus Frugi. She married Lucius Calpurnius Piso who became consul in 27 and was the mother of Gaius Calpurnius Piso, the leader of the Pisonian Conspiracy in 65.

=== Daughter of Marcus Licinius Crassus Frugi ===
Licinia Magna, daughter of the consul Marcus Licinius Crassus Frugi and Scribonia (a descendant of Pompey). She married the Roman Senator Lucius Calpurnius Piso, who served as one of the consuls in 57. Piso was later killed by Roman emperor Vespasian as an enemy of the emperor. Licinia and Piso had a daughter called Calpurnia who married Calpurnius Piso Galerianus son of Gaius Calpurnius Piso (co-consul in 41 with Claudius). Calpurnius Piso Galerianus was executed in 70 for opposing Vespasian. Licinia died at some date between 70 and 80 as her grave altar is dated from this period, which was found on the grounds of Villa Bonaparte near the Porta Salaria. The land may have been part of the family's suburban estates and her grave altar is on display at the Vatican Museums. Licinia may have had another sister called Licinia.

=== Daughter of Theodosius II ===
Licinia Eudoxia (422–462), a Roman Empress, who was only daughter of Eastern Emperor Theodosius II and wife of the Western Emperors Valentinian III and Petronius Maximus.

=== Vestal Virgins ===
- Licinia, a Vestal Virgin, condemned in 114 BC or 113 BC by the famous jurist Lucius Cassius Longinus Ravilla (consul 127 BC) along with Marcia and Aemilia, for unchastity.
- Licinia (flourished 1st century BC), a Vestal Virgin who was courted by her kinsman triumvir Marcus Licinius Crassus who wanted her property. This relationship gave rise to rumors. Plutarch says: "And yet when he was further on in years, he was accused of criminal intimacy with Licinia, one of the vestal virgins and Licinia was formally prosecuted by a certain Plotius. Now Licinia was the owner of a pleasant villa in the suburbs which Crassus wished to get at a low price, and it was for this reason that he was forever hovering about the woman and paying his court to her, until he fell under the abominable suspicion. And in a way it was his avarice that absolved him from the charge of corrupting the vestal, and he was acquitted by the judges. But he did not let Licinia go until he had acquired her property." Licinia became a Vestal Virgin in 85 BC and remained a Vestal until 61 BC.
- Licinia Praetextata, the Chief Vestal Virgin who have been the possible daughter of consul, Marcus Licinius Crassus Frugi, son of consul Marcus Licinius Crassus Frugi and Scribonia (a descendant of Pompey).

== Sources ==
- Cicero - RhetHer_4'47; Cicero: Brut_159;L Ascon_45'c-46'a;L
- Plutarch - Moralia, or Roman Questions, 284'B-C
- Attalus - 113 B.C.
