= Lucius Calpurnius Piso =

Lucius Calpurnius Piso may refer to:

- Lucius Calpurnius Piso (consul 1 BC)
- Lucius Calpurnius Piso (consul 27)
- Lucius Calpurnius Piso (consul 57)
- Lucius Calpurnius Piso (consul 175)
- Lucius Calpurnius Piso Caesoninus (disambiguation)
  - Lucius Calpurnius Piso Caesoninus (consul 148 BC)
  - Lucius Calpurnius Piso Caesoninus (consul 112 BC)
  - Lucius Calpurnius Piso Caesoninus (consul 58 BC)
  - Lucius Calpurnius Piso Caesoninus (consul 15 BC)
- Lucius Calpurnius Piso Frugi (disambiguation)
  - Lucius Calpurnius Piso Frugi (consul 133 BC)
  - Lucius Calpurnius Piso Frugi Licinianus

== See also ==
- Calpurnius Piso (disambiguation)
