= Gaius Calpurnius Piso =

Gaius Calpurnius Piso may refer to:

- Gaius Calpurnius Piso (conspirator)
- Gaius Calpurnius Piso (consul 180 BC)
- Gaius Calpurnius Piso (consul 67 BC)
- Gaius Calpurnius Piso (praetor 211 BC)
- Gaius Calpurnius Piso Crassus Frugi Licinianus

== See also ==
- Calpurnius Piso (disambiguation)
