= Varia gens =

Ancient Roman family

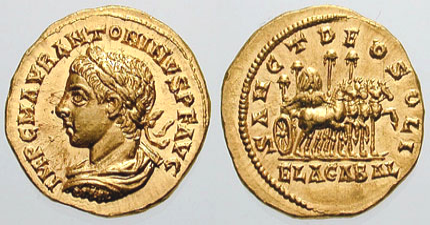
Aureus of Elagabalus, depicting the Black Stone of Emesa, emblem of Sol Invictus, being driven in a quadriga.

The gens Varia was a plebeian family of ancient Rome. Its members appear in history toward the end of the Roman Republic, when its most celebrated representative was the Augustan poet Lucius Varius Rufus, a friend and contemporary of both Horace and Vergil, with whom his works were favourably compared. A number of Varii held magistracies and other offices, but only one, Quintus Varius Ambibulus, is known to have attained the consulship, in AD 128. Still later, the emperor Elagabalus was descended from a family of the Varii that had settled in Syria.

== Origin ==
The nomen gentilicium Varius is derived from the cognomen Varus, or "knock-kneed", one of a broad class of surnames derived from the physical traits of the individuals who bore them. Chase classes it among those gentilicia that were either of Roman origin, or are found at Rome and cannot be shown to have come from anywhere else.

== Praenomina ==
Among the Varii mentioned in history, the only praenomina found during the time of the Republic are Quintus, Publius, and Lucius, all of which were among the most common names at all periods of Roman history. Other common names appear in imperial times, including Gaius, Sextus, and Titus.

== Branches and cognomina ==
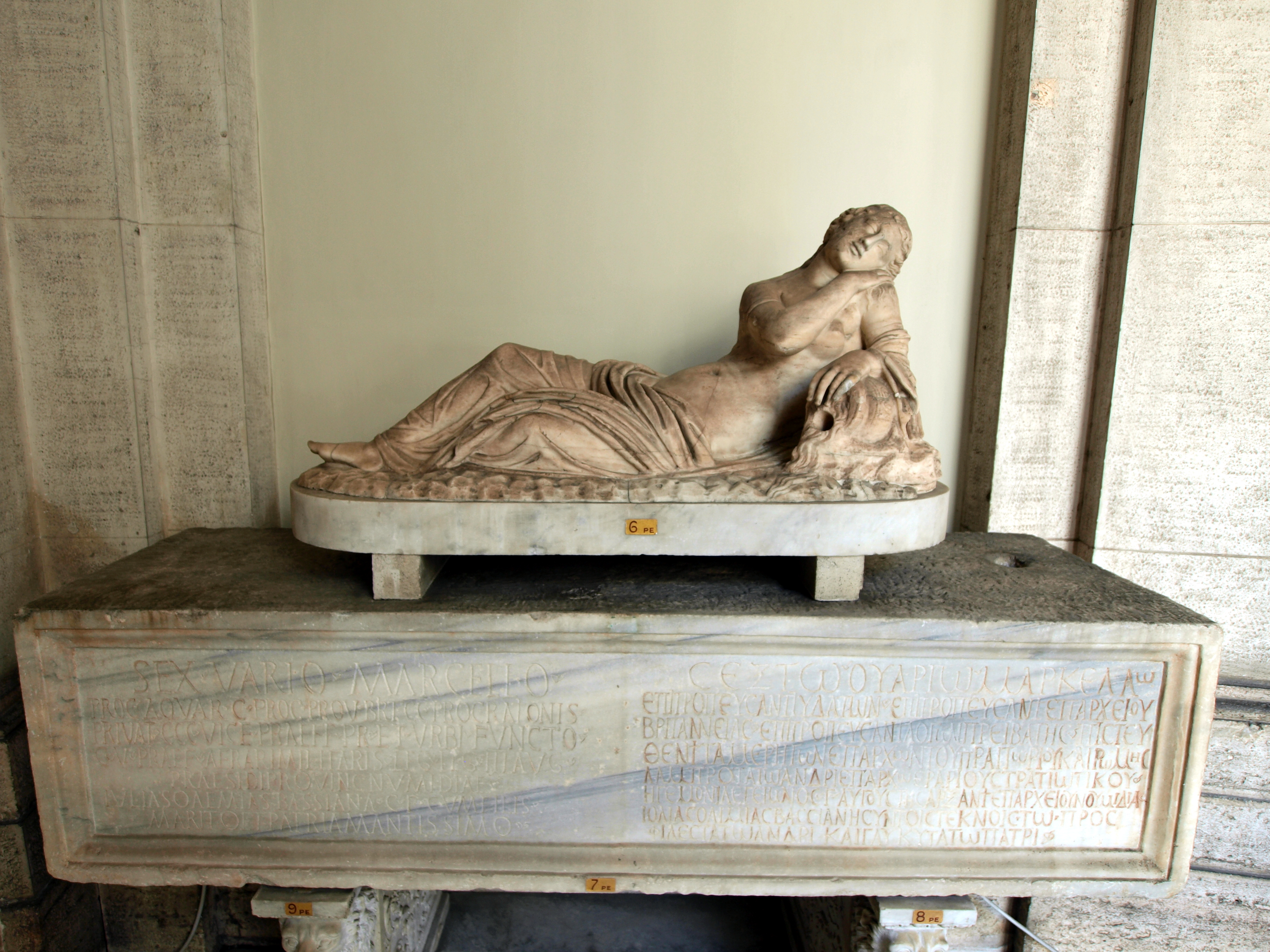
Pedestal with funerary inscription of Sextus Varius Marcellus, in Latin and Greek. The sculpture of a nymph or maenad is unrelated. Vatican Museums.

With the exception of the Varii who formed part of the Severan Dynasty in the early third century, this gens does not appear to have been divided into distinct families, in the sense that none of those appearing in history are known to have been closely related to one another, or to have followed on from the accomplishments of their predecessors, or passed down any hereditary surnames.

Quintus Varius Severus, the earliest to appear in the record, was from a colonial family that had settled in Spain, where they intermarried with the natives, leading to his cognomen of Hybrida, meaning "hybrid", or "half-breed". His original surname, Severus, referred to someone of stern countenance or demeanor.

Cotyla, borne by Antony's close friend and ally, signified a type of cup, often used as a unit of measurement equal to a hemina, or half a sextarius, and thus "half-pint". Rufus, the surname of the Augustan poet, originally signified someone with red hair. Geminus, borne by a senator of this period, indicated a twin. Proculus, belonging to a first-century praetorian, was an old praenomen that later came to be used as a surname, and probably was a diminutive of Procus, a suitor, or perhaps originally, a prince.

Ligur or Ligus, attributed to a rogue mentioned twice by Tacitus, signifies a Ligurian, indicating that its bearer was either from Liguria, or associated in some way with that place or its inhabitants. The tribune Crispinus' surname is a diminutive of crispus, referring to someone with curly hair. The consul Ambibulus had two cognomina, of which the first, Sardus, perhaps belonging to a maternal ancestor, referred to one of the Sardi, the inhabitants of Sardinia. Ambibulus has proven difficult to parse, with Ronald Syme calling it "peculiar and uncommon", and other experts unable to explain it. Clemens, the cognomen of a second-century governor, signified someone mild, gentle, or placid.

Macrinus, belonging to the relative of Severus Alexander, is a doublet of Macerinus, and derived from macer, "lean". Marcellus, the father of Elagabalus, bore a surname that was originally a diminutive of the praenomen Marcus; it was distinguished in Roman history as the cognomen of the renowned general Marcus Claudius Marcellus. Avitus, the original cognomen of Elagabalus, was a diminutive of avus, a grandfather, referring to something grandfatherly or ancestral. It was inherited from his grandfather, Gaius Julius Avitus Alexianus. The emperor's second surname, Bassianus, which he inherited from his great-grandfather, Julius Bassianus, was ultimately derived from the cognomen Bassus, or its diminutive, Bassinus, meaning "stout".

== Members ==
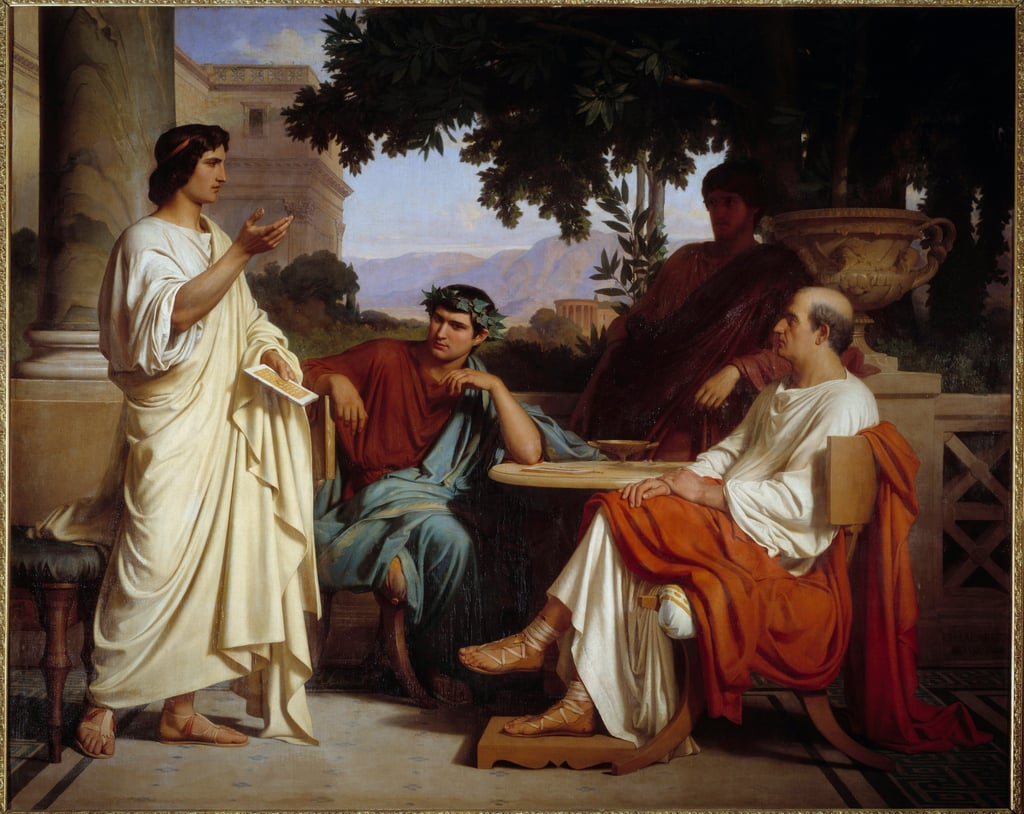
Charles Jalabert, Horace, Virgil, and Varius at the House of Maecenas, Musée des Beaux-Arts, Nîmes.

This list includes abbreviated praenomina. For an explanation of this practice, see filiation.

- Quintus Varius Severus, surnamed Hybrida, (Note: Or Hibrida.) because his mother was a native of Spain, was tribune of the plebs in 90 BC. At the urging of the equites, he proposed the Lex Varia de Majestate, a law aimed at punishing those who had encouraged the socii to revolt against Roman authority. The law was passed by force of arms, resulting in the exile and death of many prominent Romans. In 89, Varius was convicted under his own law, and put to death.
- Marcus Varius, according to Appian, a legate sent by Sertorius to assist Mithridates in 75 BC, appears to be a mistake for Marcus Marius.
- Varius Lucullus, evidently a mistake for Marcus Terentius Varro Lucullus, consul in 73 BC.
- Publius Varius, through fraud obtained a considerable amount of money from Quintus Caecilius, the uncle of Titus Pomponius Atticus.
- Quintus Varius, gave evidence against Verres during the latter's trial in 70 BC.
- Publius Varius, one of the judges at the trial of Titus Annius Milo in 52 BC, had experienced ill-treatment at the hands of Publius Clodius Pulcher, of whose murder Milo was accused.
- Lucius Varius Cotyla, (Note: Cotylo, in Plutarch.) aedile about 44 BC, was one of Mark Antony's closest allies. During the War of Mutina, Cotyla was Antony's envoy to the Senate. Subsequently, Antony placed him in command of the six legions that he left in Gallia Narbonensis, when he returned to Italy with the main force he had gathered.
- Lucius Varius Rufus, a celebrated poet in the time of Augustus, he was a contemporary and friend of both Vergil and Horace, who were both influenced by his style. Little of his work survives, apart from fragments of De Morte, preserved by Macrobius, a panegyric praising Octavian, of which a few lines were quoted by Horace, and a few words from his tragic drama Thyestes, which was greatly admired by Quintilian.
- Varius Rufus, governor of Cyprus in the late first century BC, is a faulty reconstruction of the name of Lucius Tarius Rufus, consul suffectus in 16 BC.
- Quintus Varius Q. f. Geminus, a senator who had held a number of offices, beginning in the late first century BC. Among others, he had been quaestor, tribune of the plebs, legate, praetor, and proconsul.
- Gaius Varius C. f. Julius Proculus, a man of praetorian rank, named in a first-century inscription from Rome.
- Varius Ligur or Ligus, accused of being the lover of Aquilia, whom Tiberius exiled for adultery in AD 25. Subsequently, he paid Servilius and Cornelius Tuscus, who had wrought the downfall of Mamercus Aemilius Scaurus in AD 34, to withdraw their denunciation of him; when it became known that they had accepted Ligur's money, they were exiled, and interdicted from fire and water.
- Varius, a senator dispatched by Caligula to rebuild Antioch in Syria, and who constructed a public bath there, according to an account related by John Malalas.
- Varius Crispinus, a tribune in the Praetorian Guard in AD 69. Otho ordered him to equip the soldiers of the seventeenth cohort. Crispinus thought to accomplish his task quietly at night, but the soldiers, roused from their beds, thought they had been betrayed, and mutinied, slaying Crispinus as he tried to restore order.
- Quintus Planius Sardus Lucius Varius L. f. Ambibulus, consul suffectus for the final three months of AD 128, with Aulus Egrilius Plarianus as his colleague. He had been military tribune with the Legio VII Claudia Pia Fidelis, legate of the Legio I Italica and Legio III Augusta, quaestor, tribune of the plebs, and governor of Macedonia.
- Titus Varius T. f. Clemens, a native of Celeia in Noricum, was governor of Raetia in AD 157, and at other times of Mauretania Caesariensis, Lusitania, Cilicia, Gallia Belgica, and Germania Superior. He had commanded several auxiliary units, as well as serving as tribune of the Legio XXX Ulpia Victrix.
- Varia, the paternal grandmother of the emperors Severus Alexander and Elagabalus.
- Varius Macrinus, a relative of the emperor Severus Alexander, whose orders Macrinus successfully carried out in Illyricum.
- Sextus Varius Marcellus, the father of Elagabalus, was an eques from Apamea in Syria. He was governor of Britain from AD 208 to 211, and subsequently Praefectus Urbi and Praetorian Prefect. At the time of his death about 215, he was governor of Numidia.
- Varius Sex. f. Avitus Bassianus, better known as Elagabalus, emperor from AD 218 to 222, was the son of Marcellus and Julia Soaemias Bassiana.

== See also ==
- List of Roman gentes

== Bibliography ==
=== Ancient sources ===
- Marcus Tullius Cicero, Brutus; De Natura Deorum; De Oratore; Epistulae ad Atticum; In Verrem; Philippicae; Pro Milone; Pro Scauro.
- Valerius Maximus, Factorum ac Dictorum Memorabilium (Memorable Facts and Sayings).
- Quintus Asconius Pedianus, Commentarius in Oratio Ciceronis Pro Scauro (Commentary on Cicero's Oration Pro Scauro).
- Publius Cornelius Tacitus, Annales; Historiae.
- Lucius Mestrius Plutarchus (Plutarch), Lives of the Noble Greeks and Romans (Parallel Lives).
- Appianus Alexandrinus (Appian), Bella Mithridatica (The Mithridatic Wars); Bellum Civile (The Civil War).
- Lucius Cassius Dio, Roman History.
- Aelius Lampridius, Aelius Spartianus, Flavius Vopiscus, Julius Capitolinus, Trebellius Pollio, and Vulcatius Gallicanus, Historia Augusta (Lives of the Emperors).
- Paulus Orosius, Historiarum Adversum Paganos (History Against the Pagans).
- John Malalas, Chronographia.

=== Modern sources ===
- T. Robert S. Broughton, The Magistrates of the Roman Republic, American Philological Association (1952–1986).
- René Cagnat et alii, L'Année épigraphique (The Year in Epigraphy, abbreviated AE), Presses Universitaires de France (1888–present).
- George Davis Chase, "The Origin of Roman Praenomina", in Harvard Studies in Classical Philology, vol. VIII, pp. 103–184 (1897).
- Dictionary of Greek and Roman Biography and Mythology, William Smith, ed., Little, Brown and Company, Boston (1849).
- Charlton T. Lewis and Charles Short, A Latin Dictionary, Clarendon Press, Oxford (1879).
- Theodor Mommsen et alii, Corpus Inscriptionum Latinarum (The Body of Latin Inscriptions, abbreviated CIL), Berlin-Brandenburgische Akademie der Wissenschaften (1853–present).
- Paul von Rohden, Elimar Klebs, & Hermann Dessau, Prosopographia Imperii Romani (The Prosopography of the Roman Empire, abbreviated PIR), Berlin (1898).
- D.P. Simpson, Cassell's Latin and English Dictionary, Macmillan Publishing Company, New York (1963).
- Ronald Syme, "Three Ambivii", in Classical Quarterly, vol. XXXVI, No. 1 (1986), pp. 271–276.
