= Gnaeus Calpurnius Piso =

Gnaeus Calpurnius Piso may refer to:

- Gnaeus Calpurnius Piso (consul 23 BC)
- Gnaeus Calpurnius Piso (consul 7 BC)
- Gnaeus Calpurnius Piso who became Lucius Calpurnius Piso (consul 27)

== See also ==
- Calpurnius Piso (disambiguation)
