= Atria Galla =

Ancient Roman noblewoman of 1st century CE

Atria Galla was a woman of ancient Rome related to various imperial intrigues by her husband, and reputed as "beautiful but low-born". She was first the wife of Domitius Silus but eventually left him for his friend Gaius Calpurnius Piso, whom she later became the second wife of (after Piso's marriage to Livia Orestilla was terminated by the emperor Caligula). She may have been the mother of Piso's son, Calpurnius Piso Galerianus, though he also may have been adopted.

Her husband Piso conspired against the emperor Nero in 66 CE, and most of what we know about her comes from an anecdote on the Pisonian conspiracy related by the writer Tacitus in his Annals, in which he describes Piso's wife as having no positive attributes other than her beauty, and that her history (of having left her previous husband for Piso) conferred a stain on Piso's reputation seemingly in line with his end as a traitor to the emperor.

However he does also describe Piso as being very fond of her. Tacitus cites a rumor that Piso sought to align himself with Claudia Antonia, daughter of the late emperor Claudius, to secure his position should the conspiracy succeed, but dismisses this story because (among other reasons) he believed Piso loved Atria too much to publicly entangle himself with another woman.

We do not know what happened to Atria after Piso's forced suicide for his participation in the conspiracy. Since no reprisals are described, it is believed that she was not herself persecuted for her husband's participation.

In some older sources such as the Dictionary of Greek and Roman Biography and Mythology this person is given the name "Arria Galla". But in the Latin texts of Tacitus' Annals as presented in the: Loeb Classical Library edition, Vol. 4, Book 15, p. 310; the Cambridge Greek and Latin Classics edition, p. 49; the Oxford Classical Texts edition, p. 372, the name presented is 'Satria Galla'.

== See also ==
- Atria gens
