= Gnaeus Pompeius Magnus (husband of Claudia Antonia) =

1st-century AD Roman nobleman and husband of Claudia Antonia

Gnaeus Pompeius Magnus (died AD 47) was a noble Roman who lived during the 1st century. (He is not to be confused with his namesake Pompey the Great.) Pompeius was one of the sons of the consul of the year AD 27, Marcus Licinius Crassus Frugi and Scribonia.

== Birth and family ==
According to Suetonius, Pompeius was a nobleman of the highest ancient birth. Pompeius’ birth name is unknown, however by birth and adoption through his father, Pompeius was of the gens Licinia, hence the nomen Licinius. During the Roman Empire, it was common for Roman nobles to drop their paternal names and assume the names of their maternal ancestors. Roman nobles did this to either honour the memory of their ancestors or for adoption purposes.

His paternal grandfather was consul and governor Marcus Licinius Crassus. Crassus was the adoptive son of consul and general Marcus Licinius Crassus, who was the grandson of triumvir Marcus Licinius Crassus. He was the last known direct descendant of the triumvir and was the last known direct descendant of the triumvir who bore his name.

== Life and career ==
Little is known on the life of Pompeius. During the reign of Roman Emperor Caligula (reigned AD 37–41), the emperor removed his cognomen Magnus or The Great from him and wouldn't allow Pompeius to use his cognomen. When Caligula was assassinated in AD 41, his paternal uncle Claudius became the new emperor. Claudius restored Pompeius' cognomen to him.

Pompeius’ father gained the favour of the new emperor and it was probably through this favour, that Claudius arranged for Pompeius to marry Claudia Antonia, Claudius’ daughter and only child from his second marriage to Aelia Paetina. Antonia and Pompeius married in AD 43.

Claudius had successfully conquered Britain and added it as a province to the Roman Empire. Claudius sent Pompeius to the Roman Senate to proclaim to the senators that his father-in-law had conquered Britain.

According to Suetonius, Pompeius died in AD 47, because he was stabbed to death while in bed with a favourite boyfriend. Cassius Dio states that Roman Empress Valeria Messalina (who was Claudius' third wife and out of her fear of Pompeius being a rival to Messalina and Claudius’ son, Britannicus) ordered his death. With the death of Pompeius, Antonia married Faustus Cornelius Sulla Felix, Messalina's half-brother, in order to strengthen the bloodline of the Julio-Claudian dynasty. Pompeius had no children with Antonia.

After Pompeius died his remains were interred in the tomb of the Licinii Calpurnii located on the Via Salaria. Engraved on the urn of Pompeius is this text:

"[Here lies] Gnaeus Pompeius Magnus, son of Crassus, pontiff, quaestor of the Emperor Tiberius Claudius Caesar Augustus Germanicus, his father-in-law"

== In fiction ==
Pompeius is a character in Robert Graves' novel Claudius the God (the sequel to I, Claudius). This account claims that Claudius had Pompeius killed as the latter engaged in unnatural sexual practices with the former's daughter. He was omitted from the 1976 television adaptation.

== See also ==
- Licinia gens
- Pompeia gens

== Sources ==
- Suetonius – The Lives of the Twelve Caesars – Caligula & Claudius
- Article title
- http://penelope.uchicago.edu/Thayer/E/Gazetteer/Places/Europe/Italy/Lazio/Roma/Rome/_Texts/Lanciani/LANPAC/6*.html
