= Calpurnius Piso =

Calpurnius Piso may refer to:

- Gaius Calpurnius Piso (disambiguation)
- Gnaeus Calpurnius Piso (disambiguation)
- Lucius Calpurnius Piso (disambiguation)

== See also ==
- Calpurnii Pisones
- Calpurnio Pisón, a Spanish comic artist.
