= Calpurnius Piso Galerianus =

Man of the Calpurnia gens of ancient Rome

Calpurnius Piso Galerianus was a man of the Calpurnia gens of ancient Rome who lived around the 1st century CE. He was the (possibly adopted) son of Gaius Calpurnius Piso. Gaius was married twice, to Livia Orestilla and later to Atria Galla, and it is unclear which of these women, if any, was Galerianus's biological mother.

He was married to Calpurnia, daughter of Licinia Magna and Lucius Calpurnius Piso.

In 65 CE, Galerianus's father was executed for conspiring against the emperor Nero. Just a few years later, around 69 CE, the empire was plunged into civil war during what is known as the Year of the Four Emperors, during which Nero committed suicide, and at the end of which the emperor Vespasian emerged as victorious.

It is not known exactly how old Galerianus was at this time, but he is described as "too young" to participate in the intrigues of this civil war, and despite being unremarkable and trying to live a quiet life -- the writer Tacitus describes him as having "no daring at all" -- his noble birth and his youth and popularity earned him the attention of the emperor Vespasian's prefect Gaius Licinius Mucianus, eager to quash potential threats to Vespasian's ascension.

Vespasian's partisans thought Galerianus might attract the support of the now leaderless faction of Galba, a major challenger of Vespasian during the Year of Four Emperors, who had been assassinated by Praetorians in 69 CE. This was possibly at least in part because a relative of Galerianus, Lucius Calpurnius Piso Frugi Licinianus, had been named heir by Galba himself. It probably also didn't help Galerianus that his father had been executed as a traitor to the emperor, and his father-in-law, Lucius Calpurnius Piso, had been a supporter of Vitellius -- another executed challenger to Vespasian.

Galerianus was arrested in Rome, led by armed guard for forty miles along the Appian Way, taken to a fortress and executed by injecting him with poison. His father-in-law was likewise executed on the orders of Mucianus shortly afterwards.
