= Munatia Plancina =

Roman noblewoman accused of poisoning Germanicus

- Died: 33 AD
- Cause of death: suicide
- Known for: accused of poisoning Germanicus
- Criminal charges: Sacrilege by violating the divinity of Augustus; Murder
- Spouse: Gnaeus Calpurnius Piso
- Children: Gnaeus (later changed to Lucius) Calpurnius Piso; Marcus Calpurnius Piso
- Father: Lucius Munatius L.f.L.n. Plancus

Munatia Plancina (died 33 AD) was a Roman noblewoman who lived during the reigns of Augustus and Tiberius. She was the wife of the governor of Syria, Gnaeus Calpurnius Piso. The couple was accused of poisoning Germanicus, the nephew and adopted son of the Emperor Tiberius. At first, Munatia Plancina was acquitted, but when the trial was renewed she committed suicide.

== Biography ==
=== Early life ===
Often Munatia Plancina is simply called Plancina. She was probably the daughter of a certain Munatius, who was the Comes of Tiberius during his diplomatic mission in the East. In this case she was the granddaughter of Lucius Munatius Plancus, who had been consul in 42 BC.

=== Marriage ===
Munatia Plancina was a rich woman and very self-confident because of her noble descent. She was probably the second wife of Gnaeus Calpurnius Piso. They had two sons: Gnaeus, who later changed his first name to Lucius, and Marcus Calpurnius Piso.

=== Conflict with Germanicus ===
Munatia Plancina was also a close friend of Livia, the wife of the Emperor Augustus and mother of his successor, Tiberius. When her husband was elected governor of Syria Munatia Plancina accompanied him to his province (18 AD). At this time Germanicus was given overall command in the east of the Roman Empire. Germanicus and his wife Agrippina the Elder subsequently travelled to Syria where they became involved in a serious quarrel with the governor Piso and his wife. The Roman historian Tacitus states that like Agrippina, Munatia Plancina was sometimes present at military parades. Munatia Plancina was said to openly insult Germanicus and his wife. Tacitus goes on to say that Livia secretly ordered Munatia Plancina to take this action against Germanicus and Agrippina. Munatia Plancina was supposed to have been in contact with a Syrian called Martina who prepared the poison to be used to kill Germanicus. As Germanicus was dying (10 October 19 AD) he was said to have suspected Piso and his wife of having him poisoned. The death of Germanicus supposedly gave Munatia Plancina a lot of pleasure. Then she supported her husband Piso in taking possession of Syria through military force.

In autumn 20 AD Munatia Plancina and her husband returned to Rome. The couple had to answer to the Roman Senate for their alleged murder of Germanicus. Munatia Plancina was convicted but Livia exerted pressure on Tiberius to acquit her. Munatia Plancina then dissociated herself from her husband Piso who committed suicide. A recently discovered senate resolution has confirmed that Munatia Plancina owed her acquittal to a recommendation of Tiberius, who had been persuaded by Livia to act in this way. But after the death of Livia, Munatia Plancina lost a powerful protectress. In 33 AD, Tiberius renewed the charge of murder against her. Munatia Plancina committed suicide before the judgement.

It has been noted that the family of Munatia Plancina was poorly regarded during the reign of Tiberius because of the very negative characterization of her grandfather, Lucius Munatius Plancus, by the historian Marcus Velleius Paterculus.

== See also ==
- List of distinguished Roman women

== Sources ==
- Rudolf Hanslik: Munatius 44). In: Realencyclopädie der Classischen Altertumswissenschaft, vol. XVI 1 (1933), col. 556–557.
- Munatia Plancina. In: Der Neue Pauly (English: Brill's New Pauly), vol. 7 (1999), col. 468.
