= Sulpicia Praetextata =

1st century AD Roman noblewoman

Sulpicia Praetextata (/sʌlˈpɪʃə/) was an ancient Roman noblewoman who lived in the Roman Empire in the 1st century.

== Family background ==
Praetextata was a member of the gens Sulpicia. She was the daughter of Quintus Sulpicius Camerinus Peticus, suffect consul in 46 and a mother whose name is not known. Her brother was Quintus Sulpicius Camerinus Pythicus, who was of consular standing.

== Marriage, issue and life ==
Praetextata married Marcus Licinius Crassus Frugi who served as a consul in 64. He was one of the four sons born to the Roman Politician Marcus Licinius Crassus Frugi and Scribonia.

Praetextata bore Frugi the following children:

- Daughter, Licinia Praetextata who served as Chief Vestal Virgin.
- Son, Lucius Scribonius Libo Rupilius Frugi Bonus who served as a suffect consul in 88. Frugi Bonus married the daughter of emperor Vitellius, Vitellia, by whom he had a daughter called Rupilia Faustina who became the paternal grandmother of Roman emperor Marcus Aurelius.
- Son, Marcus Licinius Scribonianus Camerinus.
- Son, Gaius Calpurnius Piso Crassus Frugi Licinianus, who served as a consul in 87. Calpurnius Piso and his wife Agedia Quintina conspired against the Roman emperor Nerva, who banished them to Taranto. Piso tried to escape and was banished by the emperor Trajan to a solitary island. He died in the course of a second escape attempt. Calpurnius Piso was placed in the tomb of Licinii Calpurnii.

Frugi was executed by the Roman emperor Nero between 66 and 68, because of information brought against him by Marcus Aquilius Regulus. In 70, early in the reign of emperor Vespasian, Praetextata brought her children to a Roman Senate meeting, seeking vengeance for her husband's death. Regulus and his associated political circle were prosecuted by the Senate. After this episode no more is known of Praetextata.

== Sources ==
- Tacitus, Histories
- Romeins Imperium – Marcus Licinius Crassus Frugi translated from Dutch to English
- article of Matidia the Elder at Livius.org
- S.H. Rutledge, Imperial Inquisitions: Prosecutors and Informants from Tiberius to Domitian (Google eBook), Routledge, 2002
- V. Rudich, Political Dissidence Under Nero: The Price of Dissimulation, Routledge, 2013
- J. Shelton, The Women of Pliny's Letters, Routledge, 2013
