= Atria gens =

Ancient Roman family

The gens Atria was a Roman family, known primarily from two individuals who flourished during the middle years of the first century BC.

== Members ==
- Quintus Atrius, a lieutenant of Caesar during his second expedition into Britain in 54 BC. He was left on the coast to take care of the ships while Caesar himself marched into the interior of the country.
- Publius Atrius, an eques who belonged to Pompeius' party. He was taken prisoner by Caesar in Africa in 47 BC but was spared.
- Atria Galla, the wife of Gaius Calpurnius Piso, who conspired against Nero.

== See also ==
- List of Roman gentes
