= Marcus Licinius Scribonianus Camerinus =

Roman senator of the 1st century

Marcus Licinius Scribonianus Camerinus was a wealthy Roman Senator that lived in the Roman Empire in the 1st century.

== Life ==
Camerinus was a member of the gens Licinia, an aristocratic plebeian family that had a distinguished lineage. He was one of the sons and among the children born to Marcus Licinius Crassus Frugi consul of 64, son of Roman Politician Marcus Licinius Crassus Frugi and Scribonia, by his wife Sulpicia Praetextata daughter of the suffect consul in 46, Quintus Sulpicius Camerinus Peticus. He was born and raised in Rome.

The father of Camerinus, Frugi was executed by the Roman emperor Nero between 66 and 68, because of information brought against him by Marcus Aquilius Regulus. After the death of Frugi, his mother took Camerinus with his siblings, to a Roman Senate meeting in 70 early in the reign of Roman emperor Vespasian, seeking vengeance for his father's death. Regulus with his associated political circle was prosecuted by the Roman Senate.

== Namesake Slave ==
Camerinus had an adventurous runaway slave called Geta who impersonated him who bore his name as Licinius Scribonianus Camerinus. In 69 during the brief reign of Roman emperor Vitellius, he wanted to upset the emperor and his government. Geta pretended to have been obliged to leave Rome in the time of Roman emperor Nero and to have since then lived concealed in Histria, because he belonged to the Crassi family which owned large possessions in Histria. Geta successfully managed to assemble around him the local population and even some soldiers who were misled by him or wished for a revolution. However Geta was seized and brought before Vitellius. When Geta's real origin was revealed, Vitellius had him executed as a common slave.

== Sources ==
- Scribonianus Camerinus article at ancient library
- S.H. Rutledge, Imperial Inquisitions: Prosecutors and Informants from Tiberius to Domitian (Google eBook), Routledge, 2002
- V. Rudich, Political Dissidence Under Nero: The Price of Dissimulation, Routledge, 2013
- J. Shelton, The Women of Pliny's Letters, Routledge, 2013
