= Lucius Calpurnius Piso Caesoninus =

Lucius Calpurnius Piso Caesoninus is a name used by several men of the gens Calpurnia during the Roman Republic, including:

- Lucius Calpurnius Piso Caesoninus (consul 148 BC)
- Lucius Calpurnius Piso Caesoninus (consul 112 BC)
- Lucius Calpurnius Piso Caesoninus (consul 58 BC)
- Lucius Calpurnius Piso Caesoninus (consul 15 BC), pontifex

== See also ==
- Lucius Calpurnius Piso (disambiguation)
- Calpurnii Pisones
