= Quintus Sulpicius Maximus =

Quintus Sulpicius Maximus (81/82–94 CE) – was an ancient Roman boy poet, whose memorial contains the only known example of juvenilia from the ancient Roman world.

== Life ==
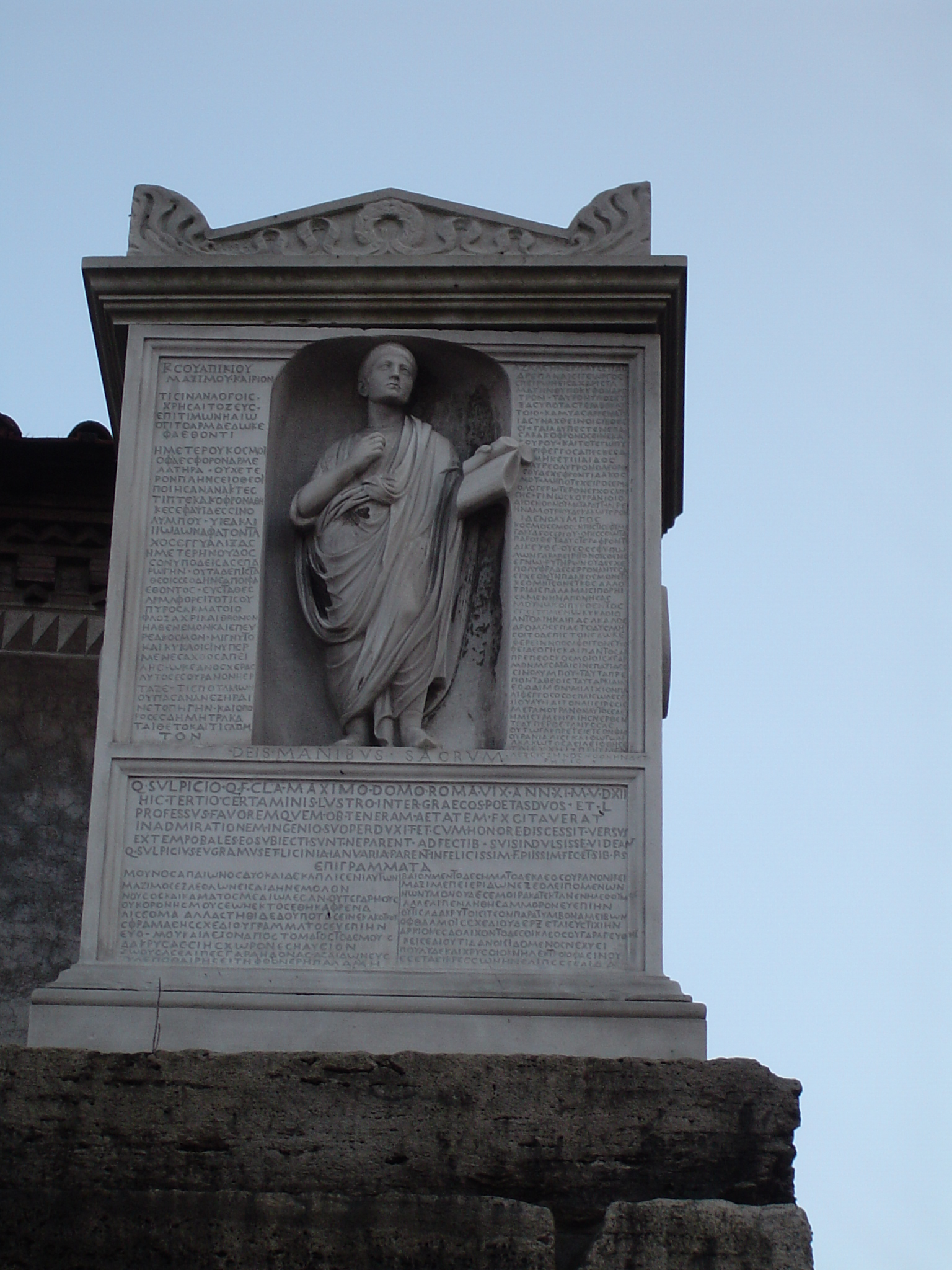
Memorial stele (replica)

The young Quintus was the son of a freedman named Quintius Sulpicius Eugramus, who was of Greek descent. As such, Quintus had mastered the Greek language almost perfectly, and took part in the poetry competition which formed part of the third edition of the Ludi Capitolini in 94. The Ludi had been founded by Domitian in 86 to celebrate the restoration of the Temple of Jupiter Optimus Maximus.

Quintus' event was an improvisation category, in which competitors had to compose a poem in Ancient Greek on the theme of the myth of Phaethon. Quintus' poem is preserved on a memorial stele, originally on the Porta Salaria, and now in the Centrale Montemartini.

According to the memorial, the 12-year-old Quintus died of overwork shortly after the competition.

== Text ==
- IGUR III 1336

== Studies ==
- The Boy Poet Sulpicius: A Tragedy of Roman Education, J. Raleigh Nelson, The School Review, Vol. 11, No. 5 (May, 1903), pp. 384–395
- The First-Century Inscription of Quintus Sulpicius Maximus: An Initial Catalogue of Lexical Parallels with the New Testament, Brian J. Wright, Bulletin for Biblical Research 27.1 (2017) pp. 53–63
