= Sextus Julius Sparsus =

First century AD Roman senator and suffect consul

Sextus Julius Sparsus was a Roman senator active in the first century AD. He was suffect consul for the nundinium September to December AD 88 as the colleague of Marcus Otacilius Catulus.

Since the recovery of a military diploma bearing his name, Julius Sparsus has been often identified as the man to whom Pliny the Younger wrote two letters on literary matters, and as the recipient of one of Martial's poems. Experts did not seriously question this identification as his cognomen "Sparsus" is, as Ronald Syme wrote in an article published in the Harvard Studies in Classical Philology, "preternaturally rare". He was only able to find it in the names of three provincials — one living in Nemausus and two in Tarraconensis — and two Romans, a rhetor frequently cited by Seneca the Elder, and Gaius Lusius Sparsus, suffect consul in 157; the existence of a third Roman with this cognomen, Gaius Pomponius Rufus Acilius Priscus Coelius Sparsus, consul in 98, was learned of after Syme wrote his paper.

However, it has been pointed out that the chronology is against this identification with the consul. According to the Lex Villia Annalis, Julius Sparsus had to be no younger than 42 when he acceded to the suffect consulship in the year 88; both of Pliny's letters have been dated between the years 105 and 108, which would have made Sparsus in his sixties when the letters were written; neither letter is written in a tone suggesting they were addressed to someone older than the always correct Pliny would normally write. This has led some academics, such as R.A. Pitcher, to argue that Pliny's letters and Martial's poem are actually addressed to Sparsus' son of the same name, likely five or ten years younger than Pliny.

There is evidence suggesting Julius Sparsus the consul may have been a proconsular governor of Africa. Michel Christol has published a fragmentary inscription from Uthina in modern Tunisia of which two lines are readable. The second line clearly contains the cognomen "Sparsus". Christol first suggests this may refer to Julius Sparsus, but the other two surviving letters forces him to reject that identification; he then argues for an identification with the suffect consul of 98 mentioned above, Coelius Sparsus. While it is possible Julius Sparsus was governor of Africa — one of the pinnacles of a successful Senatorial career — it is only a slight possibility. A more likely identification with his kinsman Gaius Pomponius Rufus Acilius Priscus Coelius Sparsus.

Political offices
Preceded by Quintus Ninnius Hasta, and Libo Rupilius Frugi as suffect consuls	Suffect consul of the Roman Empire; 88 with Marcus Otacilius Catulus	Succeeded by Titus Aurelius Fulvus, and Marcus Asinius Atratinus as ordinary consuls
