= Gnaeus Calpurnius Piso (consul 7 BC) =

Roman politician accused of killing Germanicus

- Died: 20 AD
- Cause of death: suicide
- Known for: accused of poisoning Germanicus
- Criminal charges: Insubordination; Corruption; Abandoning and reentering a province; Summary justice; Destroying military discipline; Misusing the emperor's money; Fomenting civil war; Sacrilege by violating the divinity of Augustus; Murder
- Spouse: Munatia Plancina
- Children: Lucius Calpurnius Piso (given praenomen Gnaeus); Marcus Calpurnius Piso.
- Father: Gnaeus Calpurnius Piso

Gnaeus Calpurnius Piso (c. 44/43 BC – AD 20) was a Roman statesman during the reigns of Augustus and Tiberius. He served as consul in 7 BC, after which he was appointed governor of Hispania and proconsul of Africa. Piso is best known for being accused of poisoning and killing Germanicus, the heir of emperor Tiberius.

== Family ==
He was a member of the gens Calpurnia, specifically among the Calpurnii Pisones. His father and grandfather both shared his name, with his father being Gnaeus Calpurnius Piso (consul in 23 BC), and his grandfather being one of the participants in the Catilinarian conspiracy. He had a brother, Lucius Calpurnius Piso, who was an augur and became consul in 1 BC.

Piso was married to Munatia Plancina, a woman of noble rank and wealth. By Plancina, Piso had two sons: Gnaeus Calpurnius Piso (who took the name Lucius Calpurnius Piso after his father's death, and was consul in AD 27), and Marcus Calpurnius Piso.

== Career ==
Piso held several positions under Augustus and Tiberius. Ronald Syme infers that Piso was a military tribune in the Spanish campaigns of 26–25 BC. This accords with his known tenure as triumvir monetalis in 23 BC. Between that office and being appointed quaestor, which enabled him entry into the Roman Senate, Syme infers Piso was married. Syme fills the gap between those events and his consulate with various activities, such as accompanying his friend Claudius Nero in his Alpine campaign. At some date between 5 BC and AD 2 he was admitted to the College of Pontiffs.

In 3 BC he was proconsul of the province of Africa, and of Hispania Tarraconensis in AD 9. According to Tacitus, he was cruel to the people of Spain, but during his trial in AD 20 such claims were discounted as "old and irrelevant".

Though he was given many appointments throughout his career, Piso was known to have a temper. In AD 16, he argued against Tiberius that the Roman Senate should be able to conduct business without the emperor if the emperor was away from Rome. It was only after a lengthy debate between Piso and senators close to Tiberius that he lost the debate.

=== Governorship of Syria ===
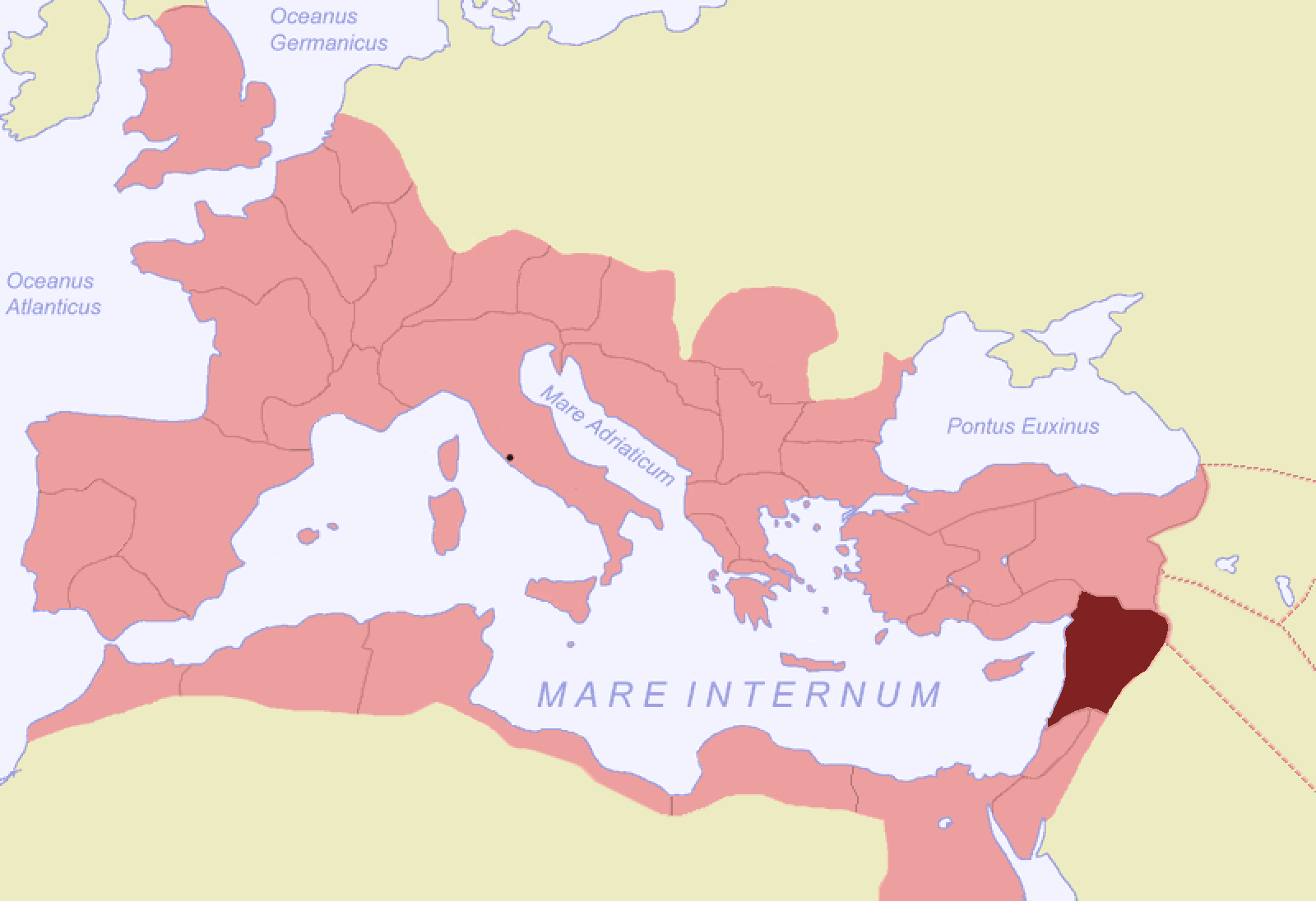
Roman Syria (in dark red) within the Roman Empire.

In AD 17, heir designate Germanicus was given command of the eastern portion of the empire and Piso was appointed as his legate, and made governor of Syria. This appointment came with the command of four legions. Though both Piso and Germanicus were of the same rank, Germanicus had greater authority (imperium maius). Tacitus suggests that Piso was appointed to act as a check on Germanicus, and that he was given secret instructions by Tiberius to thwart his efforts and control him.

In the summer of 19, Germanicus had left to take care of matters in Egypt, and when he returned he found that Piso had ignored his orders to the cities and the legions. Germanicus was furious and ordered Piso's recall to Rome. During the feud, Germanicus fell ill and, though Piso had left the province, Germanicus claimed Piso had poisoned him. Piso received a letter from Germanicus renouncing their friendship (amicitia). On 10 October, Germanicus died from the illness. Upon hearing of Germanicus' death, he returned to resume command of Syria.

== Trial ==
As the death of Germanicus occurred during their feud most people suspected him of having poisoned Germanicus, although this was never proven. The armed attempt by Piso to regain control of Syria immediately after the death of Germanicus only aroused more indignation. This, the rumors of him poisoning Germanicus, and his conduct going back as far as his governorship of Spain were all taken up by the delatores in their accusations against him. It wasn't long before the matter was taken to the Emperor.

Tiberius was forced to order an investigation, and after briefly hearing both sides, decided to defer the case to the Roman Senate. Tiberius made no effort to conceal his sentiments: the Pisones were longtime supporters of the Claudians, with their support going back to the early days of Octavian. A public trial was held, and Tiberius made allowances for Piso to summon witnesses of all social orders, including slaves, and he was given more time to plead than the prosecution, but it made no difference: before the sentencing, Piso had died. He committed suicide, though Tacitus supposes that Tiberius may have had him murdered, fearing his own implication in Germanicus' death.

The accusations brought against Piso are numerous, including:

- Insubordination
- Corruption
- Abandoning and reentering a province
- Summary justice
- Destroying military discipline
- Misusing the fiscus principis (emperor's money)
- Fomenting civil war
- Violating the divinity of Divus Augustus (sacrilege).

Although the murder of Germanicus was one of the accusations brought against him, he was only actually found guilty of abandoning and reentering Syria without authorisation to wage war, and for violating Germanicus' imperium, for, although they were both of proconsular rank, his authority was less than that of Germanicus, to whom the senate had given greater authority (imperium maius) in the eastern provinces before his departure in AD 17.

In accordance with the lex Iulia maiestatis, the senate had his property proscribed, forbade mourning on his account, removed images of his likeness, such as statues and portraits, and his name was erased from the base of one statue in particular as part of his damnatio memoriae. Additionally, the senate instructed the curatores locorum publicorum iudicandorum to remove and destroy structures built above Porta Fontinalis to connect his properties. Yet, in a show of clemency not unlike that of the emperor, the senate had Piso's property returned and divided equally between his two sons, on condition that his daughter Calpurnia be given 1,000,000 sesterces as dowry and a further 4,000,000 as personal property. His wife Plancina was absolved. Allegedly Munatia Plancina was convicted of very serious crimes. But her powerful friend Livia, the mother of emperor Tiberius, fought for her and exerted pressure on Tiberius. Therefore, her acquittal was foreseeable and she dissociated herself from her husband Piso who committed suicide. A recently discovered senate resolution also confirms that Munatia Plancina owed her impunity to the recommendation of Tiberius, who had been pressed by Livia to act in this way. But after the death of Livia in 29 AD, Plancina no longer had such a powerful protectress. So in 33 AD Tiberius renewed the charge. Plancina committed suicide before the judgement.

Piso's accomplices, a Visellius Karus and a Sempronius Bassus, were to be declared outlaws for committing treason. Their property was to be sold with profits consigned to the aerarium. It is unclear whether or not their case was handled by a judicial authority, such as a quaestio, or by the senate as well. (Note: For his accomplices, the senate advises a magistrate, the praetor, of how to handle them, whereas with Piso the Senatus Consultum de Cn. Pisone Patre handles him directly, only mentioning magistrates as far as carrying out his damnatio memoriae was concerned (Rowe 2002, pp. 16–17).)

== Character ==
Piso was recorded as a man of violent temper, without an idea of obedience, and natural arrogance who saw himself as superior to the children of Tiberius. Tacitus further alleged that Piso's marriage to Plancina, a woman of noble rank and wealth, only inflamed his ambition.

Seneca, in On Anger, speaks negatively of Piso. A legionary returned from a foraging mission without his partner and was unable to explain where his friend was. Piso, suspecting murder, accused the legionary and sentenced him to death without offering him time to search for the missing soldier. The centurion at the time was given the order to behead the accused. Fortunately for the legionary, before the centurion could swing the sword, the missing soldier walked into the camp and the execution was stopped. All three men went to Gnaeus Piso to show that the legionary had returned. To this Piso ordered all three men to be beheaded: the first because he lost his friend; the centurion because he failed to obey his orders; and the third for getting lost. Wrath had found a way to think up three crimes where there was none.

== Portrayals ==
He was played by John Phillips in the ITV series The Caesars, and by Stratford Johns in the BBC TV serial I, Claudius.

== See also ==
- Fiat justitia ruat caelum

== Bibliography ==
=== Primary sources ===
- Suetonius, Lives of the Twelve Caesars, Life of Caligula, Latin text with English translation
- Suetonius, Lives of the Twelve Caesars, Life of Tiberius, Latin text with English translation
- Tacitus, Annals, I–III, English translation
- Senatus Consultum de Pisone ("The Senate's decree against Gnaeus Piso senior")
- Seneca the Younger, de Ira I, XVIII, 3–4

=== Secondary sources ===
- Ando, Clifford; Tuori, Kaius; Plessis, Paul J. du, eds. (2016), Oxford Handbook of Law and Society, Oxford University Press, ISBN 978-0198728689
- Dando-Collins, Stephen (2008), Blood of the Caesars: How the Murder of Germanicus Led to the Fall of Rome, Wiley, ISBN 978-0470137413
- Eck, Werner; Caballos, Antonio; Fernández, Fernando (1996). Das Senatus consultum de Cn. Pisone patre. Vestigia, vol. 48: Munich: C. H. Beck, ISBN 3-406-41400-1 (in German).
- Hornblower, Simon; Spawforth, Antony; Eidinow, Esther, eds. (2012), The Oxford Classical Dictionary, Oxford University Press, ISBN 978-0199545568
- Lott, J. Bert (2012), Death and Dynasty in Early Imperial Rome: Key Sources, with Text, Translation, and Commentary, Cambridge University Press, ISBN 978-0521860444
- Rowe, Greg (2002), Princes and Political Cultures: The New Tiberian Senatorial Decrees, University of Michigan Press, ISBN 0472112309
- Sherk, Robert K. (1984), Rome and the Greek East to the death of Augustus, Cambridge University Press, ISBN 978-0521271233
- Shotter, David (1992), Tiberius Caesar, London: Routledge, ISBN 978-0203625026
- Syme, Ronald (1986), The Augustan Aristocracy, Clarendon Press, ISBN 978-0198147312
- Chisholm, Hugh, ed. (1911). "Piso" . Encyclopædia Britannica. Vol. 21 (11th ed.). Cambridge University Press. p. 652.

Political offices
| Preceded by Gaius Marcius Censorinus; Gaius Asinius Gallus | Roman consul 7 BC with Tiberius II | Succeeded by Decimus Laelius Balbus; Gaius Antistius Vetus |
