= Claudia Antonia =

Daughter of Emperor Claudius (AD c.30–66)

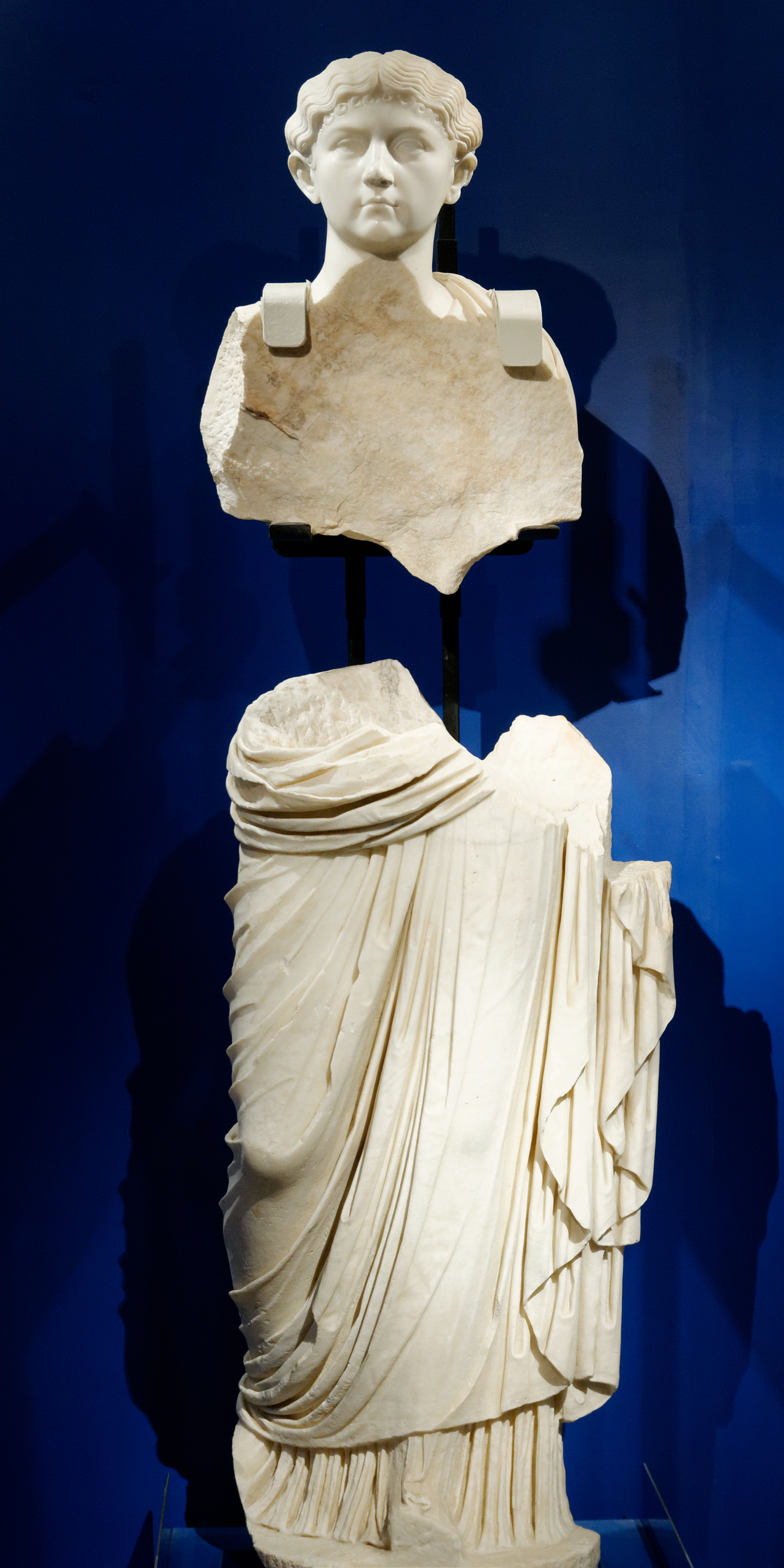
- Statue from the Domvs Romana in Melite, Malta
- Born: AD 30
- Died: AD 66
- Spouses: Gnaeus Pompeius Magnus; Faustus Cornelius Sulla Felix
- Issue: Unnamed son
- House: Julio-Claudian Dynasty
- Father: Claudius
- Mother: Aelia Paetina

Claudia Antonia (Classical Latin: ANTONIA•CLAUDII•CAESARIS•FILIA) (c. AD 30–AD 66) was the daughter and oldest surviving child of the Roman Emperor Claudius and the only child of his second wife Aelia Paetina. Antonia was a great great-niece of the Emperor Augustus, great-niece of the Emperor Tiberius, first cousin of the Emperor Caligula, half-sister to Claudia Octavia and Britannicus (her father's children by his third marriage to Valeria Messalina), and cousin, stepsister and sister-in-law of the Emperor Nero.

== Early life ==
Until 37, she was raised by her paternal grandmother Antonia Minor (who died that year). From then until 43, she was raised by her father, who became Roman Emperor in 41.

In Egypt, she held estates. In Theadelphia, she had a property with tenants.

== First Marriage ==
In 43, she first married Gnaeus Pompeius Magnus, a descendant of Pompeia (daughter of Pompey the Great). His parents were consul Marcus Licinius Crassus Frugi and Scribonia. According to Suetonius, Pompeius was stabbed to death a few years later (AD 46/47) in his own bed, alongside a favored boy. Cassius Dio states that Antonia's stepmother Empress Valeria Messalina ordered his execution out of fear that Pompeius might become a rival to her son Britannicus. The death of Pompeius left Antonia free to marry Messalina's half-brother Faustus Cornelius Sulla Felix.

== Second marriage ==
Faustus Sulla and Antonia married in 47. They had a son who was frail and died before his second birthday. In 58, Faustus Sulla was exiled, and in 62 he was murdered at the order of the Emperor Nero. In 65, Tacitus records the rumour that Gaius Calpurnius Piso intended to marry Antonia, as an element of his conspiracy against Nero.

== Death ==
In AD 66, after the death of the Empress Poppaea Sabina, Nero's second wife, Nero asked Antonia to marry him. When Antonia refused, Nero had her charged with an attempt of rebellion and executed. She was the last living grandchild of Nero Claudius Drusus and Antonia Minor, from whom Nero also was descended but one generation more distantly (i.e., their great-grandchild).

== Cultural depictions ==
Antonia briefly appears in Robert Graves' novel Claudius the God. In the story, she reveals that her first marriage with Gnaeus Pompey was never properly consummated in the two years they lived together; instead, he forced her to take part in unnatural sexual practices. Claudius, outraged by this mistreatment of his daughter, orders Pompey's death (the only moment that he orders death for personal grievances). Antonia is surprised by this act, as she thought her father cared more for his children with Messalina. Antonia and Pompey are omitted entirely in the 1976 television adaptation.
