= Quintus Varius Severus =

Plebeian tribune in 90 BC

Quintus Varius Severus (from 125 to 120 BC; died after 90 BC) was a politician in the late Roman Republic. He was also called Hybrida (of mixed race) because his mother was from Hispania.

Quintus Varius Severus Hybrida was from Sucro, Hispania (in eastern Iberian peninsula, in the contemporary municipality of Albalat de la Ribera) and was the first senator of the Republic to come from the province of Hispania. In 90 BC he was elected to the tribune. He wrote a law, the lex Varia, in order to punish all those who had “assisted” those who took up arms against the Roman people. In practice it was used to prosecute those who had supported giving the Socii citizenship. As a result, many distinguished senators, among them Gaius Aurelius Cotta, were sent to exile. In the following year after the application of the law, Varius himself was also convicted by the same law he wrote.

== Original texts ==
- Appian, Die Bürgerkriege, Buch 1,37
- Asconius 22
- Cicero, Brutus 304-305
- Valerius Maximus 8,6,4

== Literature ==
- Ernst Badian, "Quaestiones Variae", Historia 4 (1969), pp. 447–491.
- Erich S. Gruen, "The Lex Varia", Journal of Roman Studies, 55 (1965), p. 59–73.
- Jochen Martin, Die Popularen in der Geschichte der späten Republik. Dissertation, Freiburg i. Br. 1965.
- Lukas Thommen, Das Volkstribunat der späten römischen Republik. Stuttgart, 1989 ISBN 3-515-05187-2.
