= Quintus Calpurnius Piso =

Roman consul 135 BC

Quintus Calpurnius Piso was a Roman politician in the second century BC.

== Career ==
In 138 BC, whilst serving as praetor, Piso attempted to end a dispute between Sparta and Messenia regarding the possession of the Taygetus mountain range. In 135 BC, he was elected consul together with Servius Fulvius Flaccus. He unsuccessfully fought against the Numantines, sacking the city of Pallantia in retribution.
