= Licinia (1st-century BC vestal) =

Licinia (flourished 1st century BC) was a Roman Vestal Virgin. She known in history for the case against her for incest with her cousin Marcus Licinius Crassus, who allegedly attempted to frame her for breaking her vow of chastity in order to acquire her property.

Licinia belonged to a prominent family. She became a Vestal in 85 BC, and remained a Vestal until 61. She was the cousin of "triumvir" Marcus Licinius Crassus. Their close relationship gave rise to rumors. Licinia was eventually publicly accused of having broken her vow of chastity by incest with her cousin after an occasion in which she had been closeted alone with him. Licinia refuted the charge by stating that the man in question was her cousin and that they had been alone only to discuss the purchase or sale of some of her property. Her defense was successful and she was freed from charges.

Plutarch described the case:

"And yet when he was further on in years, he was accused of criminal intimacy with Licinia, one of the Vestal virgins and Licinia was formally prosecuted by a certain Plotius. Now Licinia was the owner of a pleasant villa in the suburbs which Crassus wished to get at a low price, and it was for this reason that he was forever hovering about the woman and paying his court to her, until he fell under the abominable suspicion. And in a way it was his avarice that absolved him from the charge of corrupting the Vestal, and he was acquitted by the judges. But he did not let Licinia go until he had acquired her property."
