= Marcus Licinius Crassus Frugi (consul 14 BC) =

Roman senator

Marcus Licinius Crassus Frugi (fl. 1st century BC) was the adoptive son of consul Marcus Licinius Crassus and the adoptive great-grandson of triumvir Marcus Licinius Crassus. Frugi's adoptive father was the last known direct descendant of the triumvir who bore his name.

== Life ==
Frugi served as a consul under the Roman emperor Augustus in 14 BC, during the Roman Empire. An inscription from the Balearic Islands indicates he was governor of Hispania Tarraconensis around 10 BC. Another document shows he was proconsular governor of Africa for the term 9/8 BC.

Frugi's father is unknown; however, he may have been Marcus Pupius Piso Frugi (who may have been praetor in 44 BC and could have been a legatus in 40 BC), and his paternal grandfather was Marcus Pupius Piso Frugi Calpurnianus, consul in 61 BC.

Frugi, by a wife whose name is unknown, had a son called Marcus Licinius Crassus Frugi, who served as consul in 27 who married Scribonia, a descendant of the triumvir Pompey, and a daughter called Licinia who married the consul of 27, Lucius Calpurnius Piso.

== Sources ==
Political offices
Preceded by Marcus Livius Drusus Libo; L. Calpurnius Piso Caesoninus	Roman consul 14 BC with Gnaeus Cornelius Lentulus Augur	Succeeded by Tiberius Claudius Nero; Publius Quinctilius Varus
