= Calpurnia gens =

Ancient Roman family

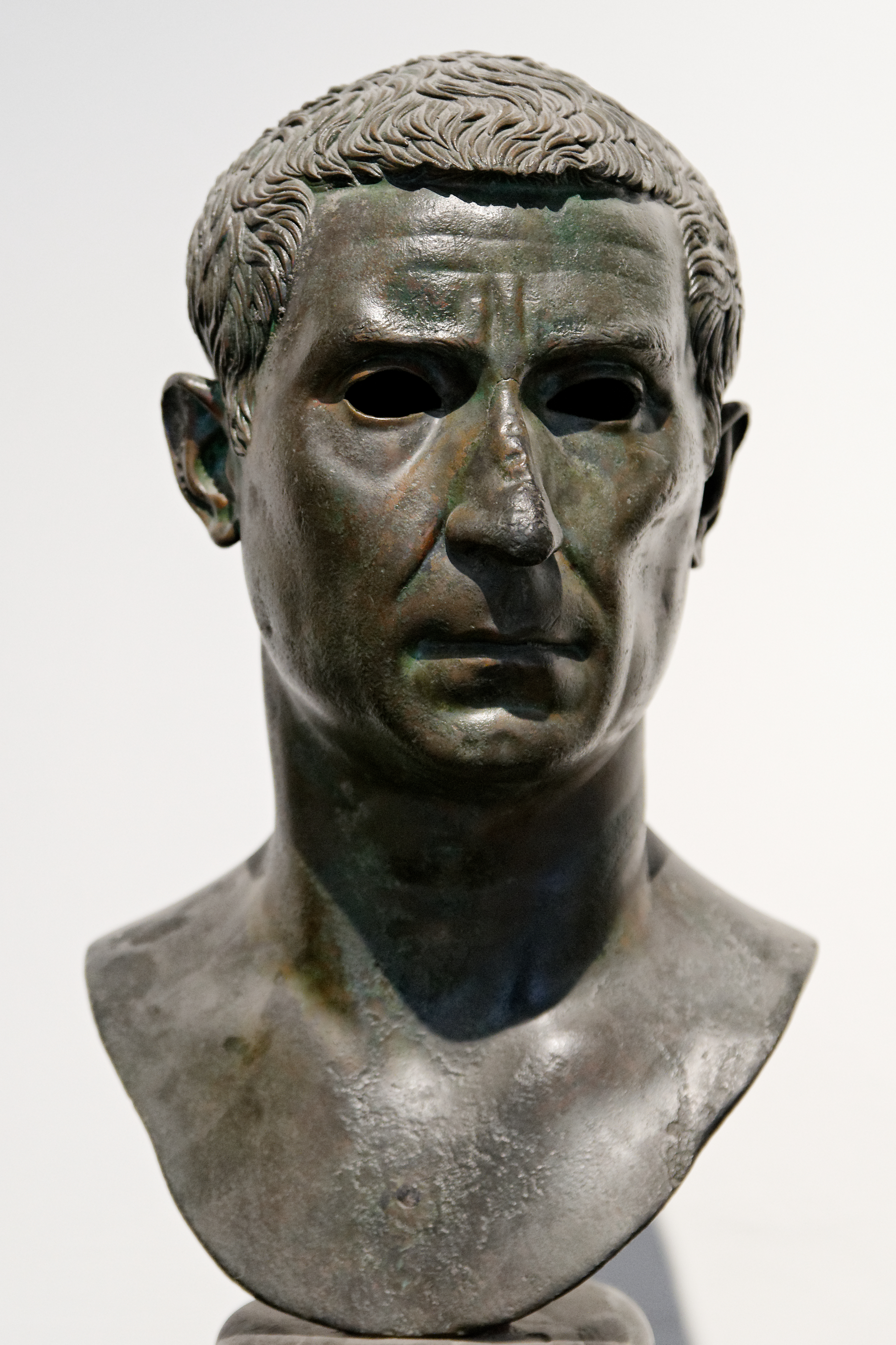
Bust of Lucius Calpurnius Piso, consul in 15 BC. Found at the Villa of the Papyri in Herculaneum, and now at the National Archaeological Museum in Naples.

The gens Calpurnia was a plebeian family at ancient Rome, which first appears in history during the third century BC. The first of the gens to obtain the consulship was Gaius Calpurnius Piso in 180 BC, but from this time their consulships were very frequent, and the family of the Pisones became one of the most illustrious in the Roman state. Two important pieces of Republican legislation, the lex Calpurnia of 149 BC and lex Acilia Calpurnia of 67 BC were passed by members of the gens.

== Origin ==
The Calpurnii claimed descent from Calpus, the son of Numa Pompilius, the second King of Rome, and accordingly the head of Numa is found on some of the coins of this gens.

== Praenomina ==
The principal praenomina of the Calpurnii were Lucius, Gaius, Marcus, and Gnaeus. Publius was not a regular name of the Calpurnia gens during the Republic, but was used by the Calpurnii Lanarii.

== Branches and cognomina ==
The family-names of the Calpurnii under the Republic were Bestia, Bibulus, Flamma, Lanarius, and Piso.

Piso was the name of the greatest family of the Calpurnia gens. Like many other cognomina, this name is connected with agriculture, and comes from the verb pisere or pinsere, which refers to the pounding or grinding of corn. The family first rose from obscurity during the Second Punic War, and from that time it became one of the most distinguished in the Roman state. It preserved its celebrity under the empire, and during the first century was second to the imperial family alone. Many of the Pisones bore this cognomen alone, but others bore the agnomina Caesoninus and Frugi.

Of the other surnames of the Republican Calpurnii, Bestia refers to a "beast", "an animal without reason". Bibulus translates as "fond of drinking", or "thirsty", while Flamma refers to a flame.

== Members ==
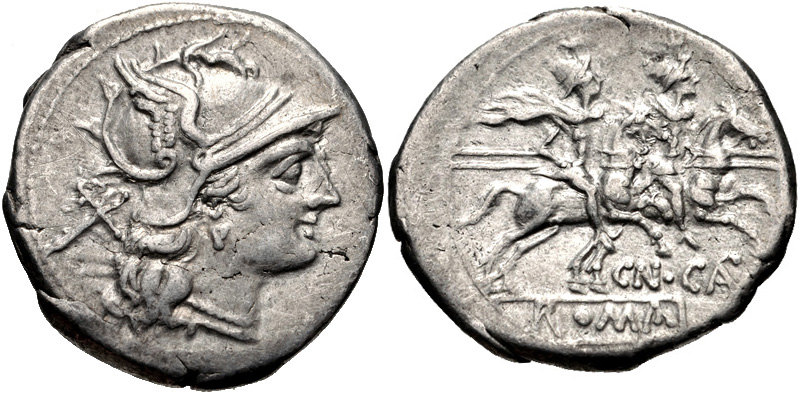
Denarius of Gnaeus Calpurnius Piso, 2nd Century BC. The obverse features a head of Roma, while the reverse depicts the Dioscuri.

This list includes abbreviated praenomina. For an explanation of this practice, see filiation.

=== Early Calpurnii ===
- Marcus Calpurnius Flamma, one of the military tribunes in 258 BC, during the First Punic War, led a daring mission to relieve the army of the consul Aulus Atilius Calatinus.

=== Calpurnii Pisones ===
- Gaius Calpurnius (C. f.) Piso, praetor urbanus in 211 BC.
- Gaius Calpurnius C. f. C. n. Piso, praetor in 186 BC, and consul in 180, triumphed over the Lusitani and Celtiberi.
- Lucius Calpurnius C. f. C. n. Piso Caesoninus, consul in 148 BC.
- Gnaeus Calpurnius Piso, consul in 139 BC.
- Quintus Calpurnius C. f. Piso, consul in 135 BC, sent against Numantia, but instead of attacking the city, plundered the territory of Pallantia.
- Calpurnius Piso, praetor circa 135, defeated during the First Servile War.
- Calpurnius Piso, fought successfully against the Thracians circa 104 BC.
- Lucius Calpurnius L. f. C. n. Piso Caesoninus, consul in 112 BC.
- Lucius Calpurnius Piso, quaestor circa 100 BC, might be the same person as the armourer.
- Lucius Calpurnius L. f. L. n. Piso Caesoninus, manufactured arms at Rome during the Social War.
- Lucius Calpurnius L. f. L. n. Piso Caesoninus, consul in 58 BC, and father-in-law of Caesar.
- Calpurnia L. f. L. n., the last wife of Caesar.
- Lucius Calpurnius L. f. L. n. Piso Caesoninus, consul in 15 BC.
- Lucius Calpurnius L. f. L. n. Piso Caesoninus, elder son of the consul of 15 BC.
- Lucius Calpurnius Piso (Frugi or Caesoninus), tribune of the plebs in 90 BC, possibly identical with a strategos of that name in Asia, whose activity has been dated variously from shortly before 90 to as late as 83.
- Lucius Calpurnius L. f. C. n. Piso Frugi, consul in 133 BC.
- Lucius Calpurnius L. f. L. n. Piso Frugi, praetor in Hispania Ulterior circa 112 BC, where he died in battle.
- Lucius Calpurnius L. f. L. n. Piso Frugi, praetor in 74 BC, frustrated some of the schemes of his colleague, Verres.
- Gaius Calpurnius L. f. L. n. Piso Frugi, quaestor in 58 BC, married Tullia, the daughter of Cicero.
- Gaius Calpurnius Piso, consul in 67 BC.
- Gnaeus Calpurnius Cn.f. Piso, one of Catiline's conspirators, quaestor pro praetore in Hispania Citerior in 65 BC. He was murdered by mutinous Spanish horsemen.
- Marcus Pupius Piso Frugi, originally one of the Calpurnii, adopted by Marcus Pupius.
- Gnaeus Calpurnius Cn. f. C. n. Piso, a partisan of Pompeius, and subsequently of Brutus and Cassius; subsequently pardoned, and made consul in 23 BC.
- Gnaeus Calpurnius Cn. f. Cn. n. Piso, consul in 7 BC, accused of murdering Germanicus.
- Lucius Calpurnius Cn. f. Cn. n. Piso 'augur', consul in 1 BC.
- Lucius Calpurnius Piso, accused of plotting against the life of Tiberius in AD 24.
- Lucius Calpurnius Piso, praetor in Hispania Citerior in AD 25.
- Lucius Calpurnius Cn. f. Cn. n. Piso, consul in AD 27.
- Marcus Calpurnius Cn. f. Cn. n. Piso, the younger son of the consul of 7 BC, was accused with his father, but pardoned by Tiberius.
- Gaius Calpurnius Piso, consul in AD 41 with the emperor Claudius, and the instigator of the conspiracy against Nero in AD 65.
- Lucius Calpurnius L. f. Cn. n. Piso, consul in AD 57 with the emperor Nero.
- Lucius Calpurnius Piso Frugi Licinianus, named heir by the emperor Galba, and murdered on the orders of Otho in AD 69.
- Calpurnius C. f. Piso Galerianus, son of the consul of AD 41, was murdered by Gaius Licinius Mucianus, a supporter of Vespasian.
- Gaius Calpurnius Piso Crassus Frugi Licinianus, consul in AD 87. Exiled to Tarentum for conspiring against the emperor Nerva; exiled again for conspiring against Trajan; murdered early in the reign of Hadrian.
- Gaius Calpurnius Piso, consul suffectus in AD 97.
- Gaius Calpurnius Piso, consul in AD 111.
- Lucius Calpurnius Piso, consul in AD 175, during the reign of Marcus Aurelius.
- Piso "Frugi", a third-century general, described as an usurper by the Historia Augusta. (Note: Piso himself seems to be a historical figure, but most of what is known of him comes from the Historia Augusta, the account of which is considerably embellished. The source attributes to Piso the surname Frugi and claims he was descended from the Calpurnii of the Republic, but this is probably an invention of the author; if indeed the name Frugi was bestowed on him, it might be because that name had previously been associated with the Calpurnii Pisones, rather than because he was one of them. It is unlikely that Piso ever proclaimed himself emperor.) In AD 261 he was sent by Macrianus Major, one of Valerian's lieutenants, to deal with Valens Thessalonicus, the governor of Achaia under Gallienus. Piso halted his troops in Thessaly, and proclaimed himself emperor, but he was slain the same year, and his revolt put down by Valens.

=== Calpurnii Lanarii ===
- Publius Calpurnius, triumvir monetalis in 133 BC, was perhaps the father of Lanarius, since the name Publius appears in no other branch of the gens.
- Calpurnius (P. f.) Lanarius, an officer during the war against Sertorius in 81 BC, he defeated and killed Sertorius' legate, Lucius Julius Salinator, in the Pyrenees. Under whom he served is unclear; he may have initially been a partisan of Sertorius, making his battle against Salinator an act of betrayal.
- Publius Calpurnius (P. f.) Lanarius, the purchaser of a house from a certain Claudius Centumalus. He might be the same man who fought against Sertorius.

=== Calpurnii Bestiae ===
- Lucius Calpurnius Bestia, consul in 111 BC, prosecuted the Jugurthine War, at first with much vigor, but through the payment of a substantial sum of money he was induced to conclude a peace. He or his son was exiled under the Varian law in 90 BC.
- Lucius Calpurnius L. f. Bestia, son of the Lucius Calpurnius Bestia who was consul in 111 BC. He may have been the Bestia who went into exile when threatened with prosecution under the lex Varia in 90 BC.
- Calpurnia L. f., the wife of Publius Antistius, and mother-in-law of Pompey. Upon her husband's murder, she stabbed herself in the chest.
- Lucius Calpurnius Bestia, a supporter of Catilina, became tribune of the plebs in 62 BC, following the failure of the conspiracy. He attacked Cicero for his actions as consul.
- Lucius Calpurnius Bestia, aedile in 57 BC, was a candidate for the praetorship. The following year, Cicero successfully defended him on a charge of electoral bribery. He later went into exile, but regained his status and became a follower of Mark Antony.
- Lucius Sempronius L. f. L. n. Atratinus, consul in 34 BC, was the natural son of a Calpurnius Bestia. His father was probably the Lucius Calpurnius Bestia who was aedile in 57 BC. His mother may have been a Sempronia.

=== Calpurnii Bibuli ===
- Gaius Calpurnius (Bibulus), father of the consul Marcus Calpurnius Bibulus.
- Marcus Calpurnius C. f. Bibulus, consul in 59 BC, was an opponent of Caesar, and a partisan of Pompeius during the Civil War.
- Marcus Calpurnius M. f. C. n. Bibulus, eldest son of the consul Marcus Calpurnius Bibulus, was killed in Egypt in 50 BC by the soldiers of Aulus Gabinius.
- Gaius Calpurnius M. f. C. n. Bibulus, the second son of the consul Marcus Calpurnius Bibulus, was also killed by the Gabiniani in Egypt in 50 BC.
- Lucius Calpurnius M. f. C. n. Bibulus, the third son of the consul Marcus Calpurnius Bibulus, was appointed governor of Syria by Augustus.
- Calpurnia M. f. C. n., daughter of the consul Marcus Calpurnius Bibulus, (Note: Generally assumed to be a daughter by Bibulus first wife, but Zmeskal believes that this woman is the daughter of Porcia, as two children of Porcia are known to have existed, but it is not certain who the second one was and first wife of Marcus Valerius Messalla Corvinus.)
- (Gaius) Calpurnius M. f. C. n. Bibulus, (Note: His praenomen may have been Marcus instead of Gaius, but most historians such as Syme and Strachan lean toward Gaius.) the fourth son of the consul Marcus Calpurnius Bibulus, and the only attested son by his second wife, Porcia, became the stepson of Marcus Junius Brutus upon her remarriage.
- Gaius (Calpurnius) Bibulus, aedile in AD 22, may have been the son of Gaius Calpurnius Bibulus, Brutus' stepson.
- (Calpurnia) Domitia Calvina, daughter of Lucius and Domitia Calvina, was the mother of Marcus Junius Silanus Torquatus, consul in AD 19.

=== Others ===
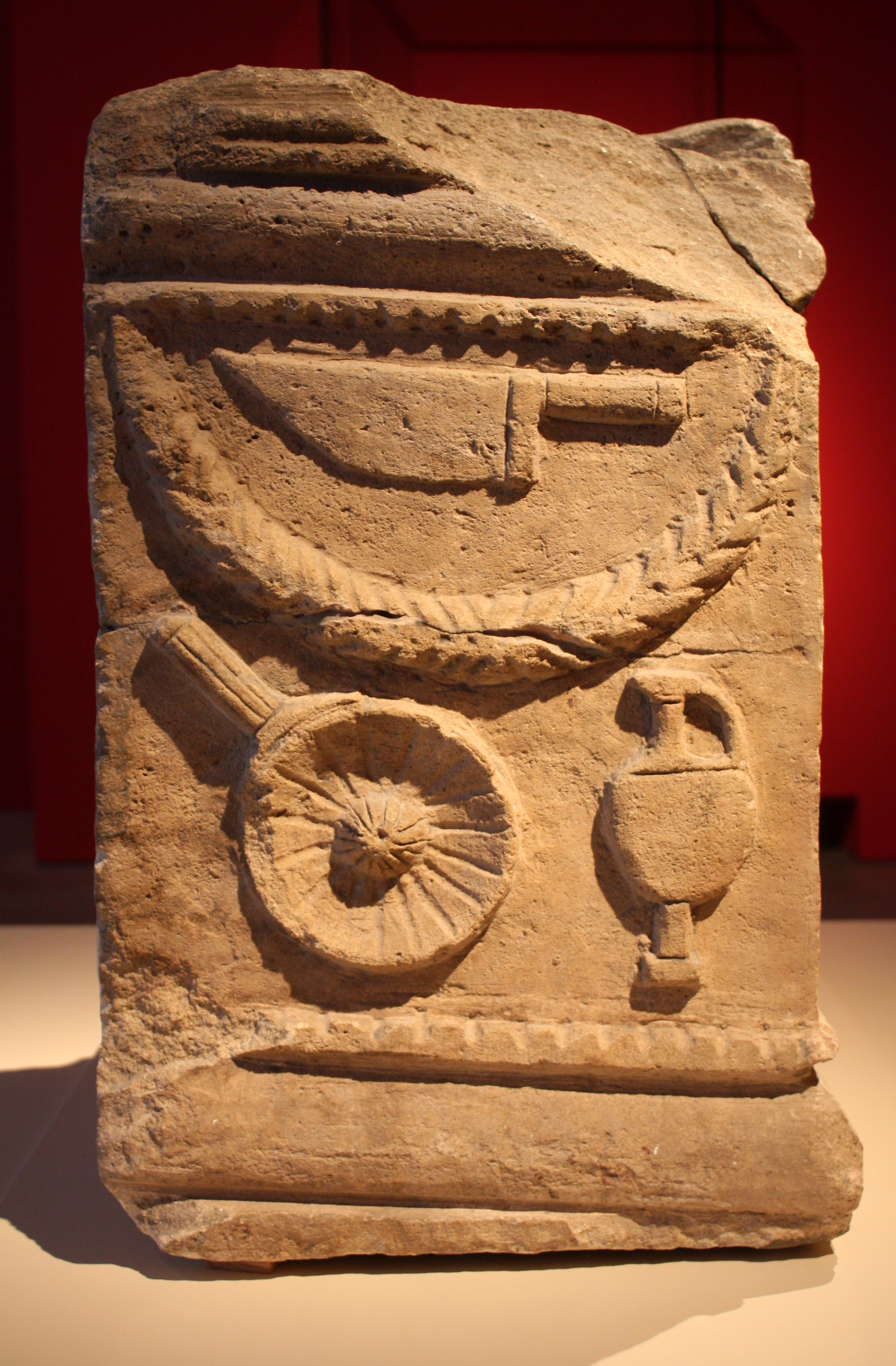
Altar of Fortuna, dedicated by Gnaeus Calpurnius Verus, prefect of a cohort of soldiers stationed at Castellum apud Confluentes, modern Koblenz.

- Lucius Calpurnius, sent as ambassador to the Achaians at Sicyon in 198 BC.
- Calpurnius, a praetorian senator around 90 BC, may be identical with Publius, the monetalis in 133.
- Calpurnius, standard-bearer of the first legion in Germania at the accession of Tiberius in AD 14, he prevented the soldiers of Germanicus from murdering Munatius Plancus, the envoy of the senate.
- Gaius Calpurnius Aviola, consul in AD 24, perhaps one of the Pisones.
- Calpurnius Salvianus, accused Sextus Marius in AD 25, but was rebuked by Tiberius and banished by the senate.
- Calpurnia, a favorite concubine of the emperor Claudius, despatched by Narcissus to inform the emperor of the marriage of Messalina and Gaius Silius.
- Calpurnia, a woman of high rank, exiled due to the jealousy of Agrippina, the wife of Claudius, but recalled by Nero in AD 60, after Agrippina's murder.
- Calpurnius Fabatus, an eques accused of various crimes during the reign of Nero; he was grandfather of Calpurnia, the third wife of Pliny the Younger.
- Calpurnia, the third wife of Pliny the Younger.
- Calpurnius Asprenas, appointed governor of Galatia and Pamphylia by the emperor Galba, induced the partisans of the false Nero to put the usurper to death.
- Marcus Calpurnius [...]icus, consul suffectus in AD 96.
- Calpurnius Flaccus, a rhetorician in the time of Hadrian.
- Marcus Calpurnius Rufus, the father of Longus, the consul of 144.
- Lucius Marcius Celer Marcus Calpurnius M. f. Longus, consul suffectus in AD 144. This family was from Attaleia.
- Sextus Calpurnius Agricola, consul suffectus in AD 154, and subsequently governor of Germania Superior and Britain. In the late 160s, he was imperial legate in Dacia, and governor of Lower Moesia.
- Gaius Calpurnius Rufinus, a third-century senator who constructed the Sanctuary of Panoias, dedicated to Serapis and other divinities of the underworld, now in Vila Real, Portugal.
- Titus Calpurnius Siculus, a poet, who probably flourished in the latter half of the third century.
- Calpurnius, a fourth century Christian deacon, and the father of St. Patrick.

== See also ==
- List of Roman gentes

== Bibliography ==
- Marcus Tullius Cicero, De Officiis, In Pisonem, In Verrem, Philippicae.
- Gaius Julius Caesar, Commentarii de Bello Civili (Commentaries on the Civil War).
- Quintus Horatius Flaccus (Horace), Ars Poëtica (The Art of Poetry).
- Titus Livius (Livy), History of Rome.
- Marcus Velleius Paterculus, Compendium of Roman History.
- Valerius Maximus, Factorum ac Dictorum Memorabilium (Memorable Facts and Sayings).
- Gaius Plinius Caecilius Secundus (Pliny the Younger), Epistulae (Letters).
- Publius Cornelius Tacitus, Annales, Historiae.
- Lucius Mestrius Plutarchus (Plutarch), Lives of the Noble Greeks and Romans.
- Lucius Annaeus Florus, Epitome de T. Livio Bellorum Omnium Annorum DCC (Epitome of Livy: All the Wars of Seven Hundred Years).
- Appianus Alexandrinus (Appian), Hispanica (The Spanish Wars).
- Sextus Pompeius Festus, Epitome de M. Verrio Flacco de Verborum Significatu (Epitome of Marcus Verrius Flaccus' On the Meaning of Words).
- Cassius Dio, Roman History.
- Aelius Lampridius, Aelius Spartianus, Flavius Vopiscus, Julius Capitolinus, Trebellius Pollio, and Vulcatius Gallicanus, Historia Augusta (Augustan History).
- Julius Obsequens, Liber de Prodigiis (The Book of Prodigies).
- Paulus Orosius, Historiarum Adversum Paganos (History Against the Pagans).
- Sextus Aurelius Victor (attributed), Epitome de Caesaribus.
- Pierre Pithou (Petrus Pithoeus) Declamations of Calpurnius Flaccus, Paris, 1580.
- Joseph Hilarius Eckhel, Doctrina Numorum Veterum (The Study of Ancient Coins, 1792–1798).
- Dictionary of Greek and Roman Biography and Mythology, William Smith, ed., Little, Brown and Company, Boston (1849).
- Theodor Mommsen et alii, Corpus Inscriptionum Latinarum (The Body of Latin Inscriptions, abbreviated CIL), Berlin-Brandenburgische Akademie der Wissenschaften (1853–present).
- René Cagnat et alii, L'Année épigraphique (The Year in Epigraphy, abbreviated AE), Presses Universitaires de France (1888–present).
- August Pauly, Georg Wissowa, et alii, Realencyclopädie der Classischen Altertumswissenschaft (Scientific Encyclopedia of the Knowledge of Classical Antiquities, abbreviated RE or PW), J. B. Metzler, Stuttgart (1894–1980).
- T. Robert S. Broughton, The Magistrates of the Roman Republic, American Philological Association (1952–1986).
- Ronald Syme,"Missing Senators", Historia: Zeitschrift für Alte Geschichte, Bd. 4, H. 1 (1955), pp. 52–71; "Piso Frugi and Crassus Frugi", in Journal of Roman Studies, vol. 50 (1960).
- D.P. Simpson, Cassell's Latin and English Dictionary, Macmillan Publishing Company, New York (1963).
- Anthony R. Birley, Marcus Aurelius, B. T. Batsford, London (1966).
- Michael Crawford, Roman Republican Coinage, Cambridge University Press (1974, 2001).
- Paul A. Gallivan, "The Fasti for A.D. 70–96", in Classical Quarterly, vol. 31, pp. 186–220 (1981).
- Jane W. Crawford, M. Tullius Cicero: The Lost and Unpublished Orations, Vandenhoeck & Ruprecht (1984) ISBN 9783525251782.
- R. J. Tarrant (editor), "unknown article", in Harvard Studies in Classical Philology, Harvard University Press, vol. XCI, pp. 198 ff. (1987) ISBN 9780674379398.
- Ronald Syme, "M. Bibulus and Four Sons", in Harvard Studies in Classical Philology, Harvard University Press, vol. 91, pp. 185–198 (1987).
- Broughton, "Candidates Defeated in Roman Elections: Some Ancient Roman "Also-Rans"", Transactions of the American Philosophical Society, vol. 81, no. 4 (1991), pp. 1–64, JSTOR 1006532.
- Werner Eck, "L. Marcius Celer M. Calpurnius Longus Prokonsul von Achaia und Suffektkonsul unter Hadrian", in Zeitschrift für Papyrologie und Epigraphik, vol. 86, pp. 97–106 (1991).
- Christoph F. Konrad, Plutarch's Sertorius: A Historical Commentary, University of North Carolina Press, Chapel Hill (1994) ISBN 0-8078-2139-X.
- Giuseppe Camodeca, "Una nuova coppia di consoli del 148 e il proconsul Achaiae M. Calpurnius Longus", in Zeitschrift für Papyrologie und Epigraphik, vol. 112, pp. 235–240 (1996).
- John D. Grainger, Nerva and the Roman Succession Crisis of AD 96–99, Routledge, London (2004).
- Tom Holland, Rubicon: The Triumph and Tragedy of the Roman Republic, Abacus, London (2004) ISBN 978-0-349-11563-4.
- Klaus Zmeskal, Adfinitas: Die Verwandtschaften der senatorischen Führungsschicht der römischen Republik von 218-31 v.Chr, vol. 1, Karl Stutz Verlag, (2009) ISBN 9783888493041.
- Patricia Southern, Roman Britain: A New History 55 BC–AD 450, Amberley (2011).
- Ronald Syme, Approaching the Roman Revolution: Papers on Republican History, Oxford University Press (2016)ISBN 9780191079757.
