= Livia Orestilla =

Second wife of Roman emperor Caligula

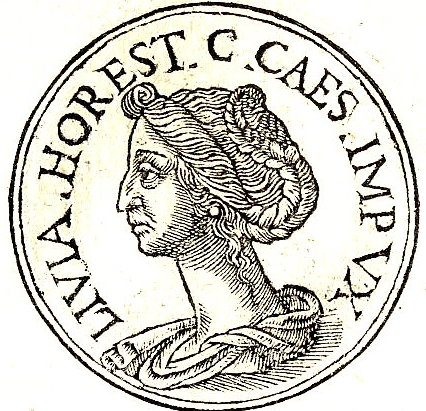
- Imaginary depiction of Orestilla in the Promptuarium Iconum Insigniorum

Roman empress
- Tenure: c. 37–38
- Spouse: Gaius Calpurnius Piso; Caligula

Livia Orestilla, alternately Cornelia Orestilla or Orestina, was the second wife of the Roman emperor Caligula in AD 37 or 38.

== Biography ==
=== Background and name ===
Her name is given in ancient sources in several variants. Suetonius calls her "Livia Orestilla", but Cassius Dio and later historians call her "Cornelia Orestina", although the cognomen "Orestina" could be a corruption of "Orestilla".

Christian Settipani has speculated that her mother may have been a Livia, and thus Orestilla chose to use the more imperial name "Livia" instead of "Cornelia" to identify herself, similar to Livia Medullina. An inscription at the Capitoline Museums records a Cornelia Lemnias who was a relative (likely sister) of a Cornelia Orestina, but it is not certain if this woman is the same as the empress.

Orestilla's father may have been Lucius Cornelius Scipio Orestinus. He was descended from a branch of the Scipiones who were adopted from the Cornelii Lentuli; he might also be descended from the Mucia gens and the obscure Livii Ocellae. A relation to the Lentuli would help to explain why Orestilla was chosen to become the mother of Julian heirs.

=== Marriages ===
She was originally married to Gaius Calpurnius Piso, who was later involved in a conspiracy to overthrow Nero in AD 65. However, Piso was persuaded or forced to annul the marriage so that Caligula could marry her. According to both Dio and Suetonius, this occurred during Piso and Orestilla's wedding celebrations. Suetonius claims that Caligula issued a proclamation the next day that he had acquired a new wife in the tradition of Romulus and Augustus, who had both stolen wives from other men. Orestilla was apparently an unwilling Empress, and remained loyal to her first husband. On the next day Caligula divorced Orestilla; however, he also prohibited her from returning to her relationship with Piso.

Later both Orestilla and Piso were banished for adultery to a distant island. Piso returned to Rome, one year later, after Caligula's assassination.

== See also ==
- List of distinguished Roman women
- List of Roman and Byzantine empresses
- Women in ancient Rome
