= Lucius Calpurnius Piso Frugi =

Lucius Calpurnius Piso Frugi may refer to:

- Lucius Calpurnius Piso Frugi (consul 133 BC), Roman annalist and politician
- Lucius Calpurnius Piso Frugi Licinianus, adopted heir of the emperor Galba, murdered by the emperor Otho
