= Lex Varia =

Roman law (90 BC)

The lex Varia was a law introduced by the Roman tribune Quintus Varius Severus in the year 90 BC. The law created a special tribunal responsible for prosecuting Roman politicians who had "encouraged" the rebellion of the Socii during the currently raging Social War. In practice this meant that Varius and the factions which supported him got to exile their political opponents. When the tumult died down the establishment turned against Varius and he was exiled using his own law. Later, politicians like tribune Publius Sulpicius would try to have the sentences rescinded.
