= Marcus Aquilius Regulus =

1st century AD Roman senator and delator (informer)

Marcus Aquilius Regulus was a Roman senator, and notorious delator or informer who was active during the reigns of Nero and Domitian. Regulus is one of the best known examples of this occupation, in the words of Steven Rutledge, due to "the vivid portrait we have of his life and career in Pliny, Tacitus, and Martial." Despite this negative reputation, Regulus was considered one of the three finest orators of Roman times. Rutledge points to the judgment of Martianus Capella, who ranked him with Pliny the Younger and Fronto as the greatest Roman orators after Cicero. However, none of his speeches have survived from ancient times.

According to Tacitus, his father was exiled under Nero and his wealth divided amongst his creditors, but does not name him. Paul von Rohden suggests his father might be identified with Lucius Aquillius L.f. Regulus, the pontifex and quaestor of Tiberius mentioned in CIL VI, 2122. Tacitus also identifies Lucius Vipstanus Messalla as his half-brother, and it is generally assumed they shared the same mother; she has not been identified.

== Life ==
His period of greatest notoriety was during the reign of Nero, when Regulus prosecuted Marcus Licinius Crassus Frugi, Servius Cornelius Scipio Salvidienus Orfitus, and was involved in the cases of Quintus Sulpicius Camerinus Peticus and his son. Pliny claims he was as active in the reign of Domitian as he was during the reign of Nero, but we know very little about his activities during the later period.

Following the conclusion of the Year of Four Emperors, Regulus was prosecuted by Curtius Montanus for his activities as a delator; during this trial he was ably defended by his half brother Vipstanus Messalla, and despite the appearance of Crassus Frugi's wife Sulpicia Praetextata with their young children before the Senate, Regulus evaded punishment. Regulus found favor under Vespasian, and scholars argue over whether Regulus was awarded a suffect consulate in 84 or 85. While Ronald Syme argues for the honor, Rutledge is less certain that he achieved this office.

According to Pliny, Regulus was in fear of his life following the assassination of Domitian. In one of his letters, Pliny describes how the man was intent on achieving a rapprochement with Pliny before Junius Mauricus could return from exile and possibly extract some revenge on Regulus for his relegation. Pliny was clearly hostile towards Regulus, for in another letter he recounts how Regulus indulged in legacy hunting, and presents an unsympathetic portrait of Regulus' mourning over the early death of his only son.

Rutledge dates Regulus' death as "sometime before 106."
