= Aelia Paetina =

Second wife of Roman emperor Claudius

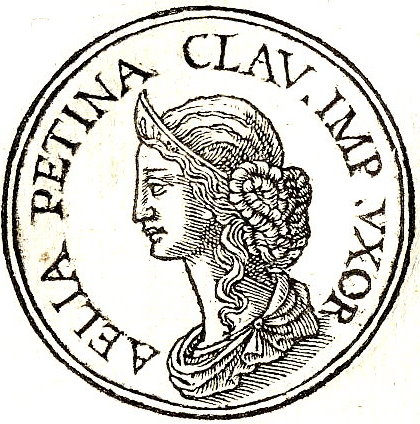
- Aelia Paetina from Promptuarii Iconum Insigniorum
- Spouse: Claudius
- Issue: Claudia Antonia
- House: Julio-Claudian Dynasty (by marriage)
- Father: Sextus Aelius Catus
- Mother: unknown

Aelia Paetina or Paetina (fl. early 1st century AD) was the second wife of the Roman Emperor Claudius. Her biological father was a consul of 4 AD, Sextus Aelius Catus, while her mother is unknown.

== Family ==
She was born into the family of the Aelii Tuberones, and thus apparently descended from the consul of 11 BC, Q. Aelius Tubero. Her father may have died when she was very young, as she was raised by a relative—Praetorian Guard Prefect Lucius Seius Strabo, the biological father of her adoptive brother Lucius Aelius Sejanus, commander of the Praetorian Guard under the Emperor Tiberius.

Aelia Paetina married the future Emperor Claudius in 28 as his second wife. Their only child was their daughter Claudia Antonia, born in 30. Claudius divorced Paetina after October of 31 AD, when her adoptive brother fell from power and was murdered. According to Suetonius, Claudius divorced Paetina for slight offenses. It has been further suggested by Leon that these slight offenses could more specifically refer to "mental cruelty" towards Claudius.

In 48, after the execution of Claudius’ third wife Valeria Messalina, Claudius considered marrying for the fourth time. Claudius’ freedman Tiberius Claudius Narcissus suggested to him a remarriage to Paetina, and reminded him they had a child together. Narcissus also stated that Paetina would cherish Antonia in addition to Claudia Octavia and Britannicus, Claudius’ children with Messalina. But another freedman, Gaius Julius Callistus, was against Claudius remarrying Paetina and stated to Claudius that he divorced her before; Callistus said that remarrying Paetina would make her more arrogant. Callistus suggested Lollia Paulina, Caligula's third wife. The third freedman, Marcus Antonius Pallas, recommended Claudius' niece and Caligula's sister Agrippina the Younger, who also had a child from a previous marriage, the future Emperor Nero. Ultimately, Agrippina was chosen.

== Cultural depictions ==
Paetina was played by Liane Aukin in the 1976 television series I, Claudius.

== Sources ==
- Suetonius, The Twelve Caesars, Claudius.
- Tacitus, The Annals of Imperial Rome.
