= Gaius Calpurnius Piso (conspirator) =

Roman senator and conspirator against Nero (died 65 AD)

- Died: AD 65
- Cause of death: Forced suicide
- Occupation: Senator
- Known for: Instigating the pisonian conspiracy
- Spouse(s): Livia Orestilla; Atria Galla
- Children: Calpurnius Piso Galerianus
- Parents: Lucius Calpurnius Piso (father); Licinia (mother)
- Family: gens Calpurnia

Gaius Calpurnius Piso (died AD 65) was a Roman senator in the first century. He was the focal figure in the Pisonian conspiracy of AD 65, the most famous and wide-ranging plot against the throne of Emperor Nero.

== Character and early life ==
He was the son of the consul Lucius Calpurnius Piso and his wife Licinia, daughter of the consul Marcus Licinius Crassus Frugi and sister of Marcus Licinius Crassus Frugi, a senator.

Piso was extremely well liked throughout Rome. Through his father he inherited connections with many distinguished families, and from his mother great wealth. Piso came from the ancient and noble house of the Calpurnii and he distributed his great wealth among many beneficiaries of all Roman social classes. Among a wide range of interests, Piso sang on the tragic stage, wrote poetry, played an expert game of Latrunculi, and owned the villa Pisoni at Baiae.

Piso was tall, good-looking, affable, and an excellent orator and advocate in the courts. Despite these facts Piso's overall integrity was questionable. According to Tacitus, Piso used his eloquence to defend his fellow citizens and was generous and gracious in speech, but lacked earnestness and was overly ostentatious, while craving the sensual. In AD 40, the Emperor Caligula banished Piso from Rome after he took a fancy to Piso's wife, Livia Orestilla. Caligula forced Piso's wife to leave him, and then accused Piso of adultery with her in order to establish cause for banishment. Piso would return to Rome one year later, after Caligula's assassination. He later married Atria Galla, after she left her first husband Domitius Silus.

== Pisonian conspiracy and death ==
Claudius recalled Piso to Rome, probably soon after his accession in AD 41. He was suffect consul in an unknown year. Piso then became a powerful senator during the reign of Emperor Nero and in AD 65 led a secret initiative to replace Emperor Nero that became known as the Pisonian conspiracy.

Piso leveraged senatorial anger with Nero to gain power. Already in AD 62, there had been talk among those of senatorial rank, in the nobility, and among the equites that Nero was ruining Rome. By AD 65, the city had endured the Great Fire of Rome, spurring groups of conspirators to come together under the leadership of Piso with the goal of killing Nero.

On 19 April AD 65, the freedman Milichus betrayed Piso's plot to kill the emperor and the conspirators were all arrested. In all, 19 were put to death and 13 exiled, reflecting the massive scope of the conspiracy. Piso was ordered to commit suicide and so he killed himself. His properties including the Villa Pisoni in Baiae were confiscated to become imperial property.

Piso was survived by his son, Calpurnius Piso Galerianus, who married Calpurnia, daughter of Licinia Magna and Lucius Calpurnius Piso, who served as one of the consuls in AD 57. Galerianus was executed in AD 70 for opposing the Emperor Vespasian.

== Legacy ==
Piso is probably the one referred to by Calpurnius Siculus under the name of "Meliboeus", and he is the subject of the panegyric De laude Pisonis (On the praise of Piso).

== See also ==
- Calpurnii Pisones

== Sources ==
- Theodor Mommsen. The History of Rome, Book IV at Project Gutenberg
