= Porta Salaria =

Former gate in the Aurelian Walls of Rome

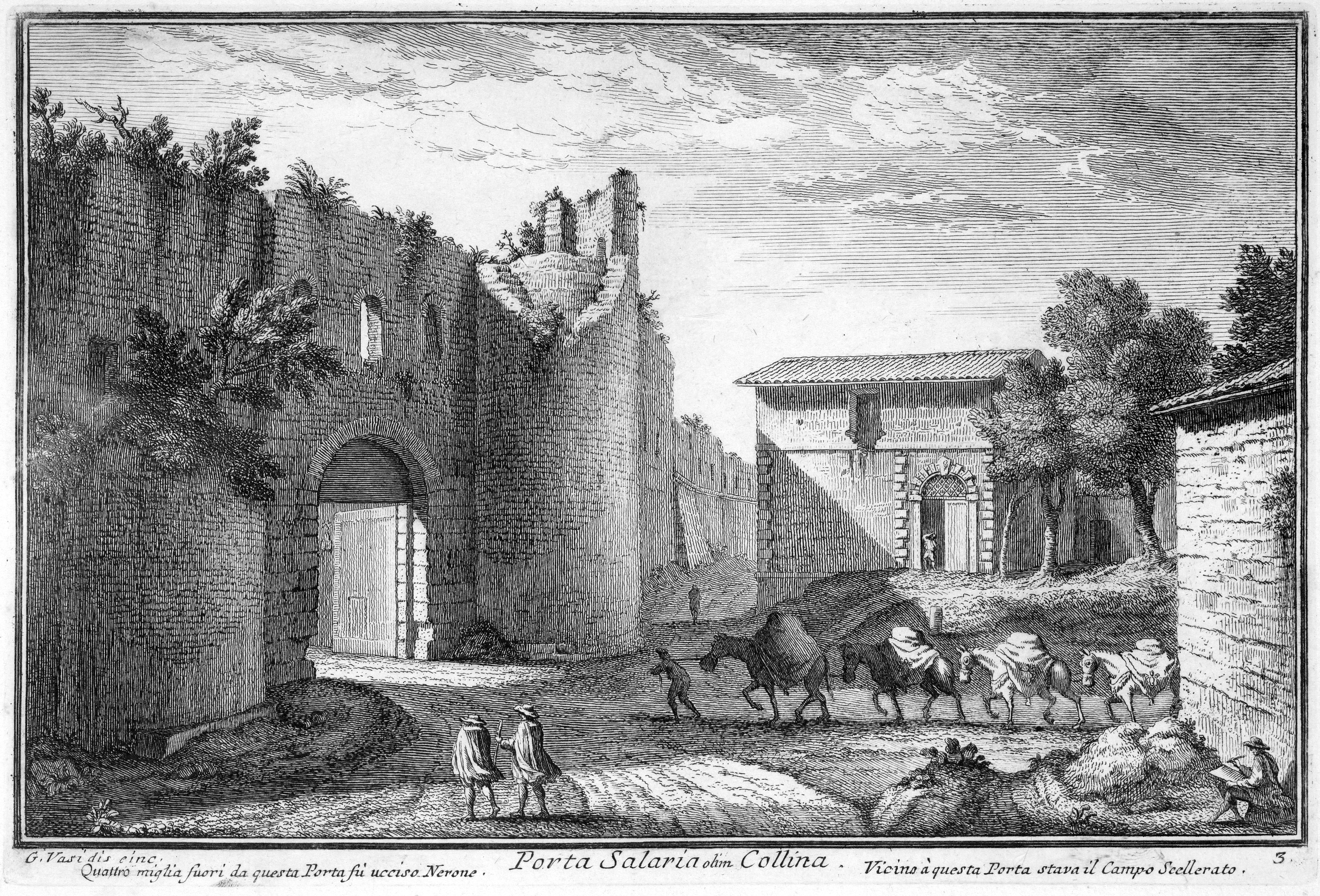
- Porta Salaria in an etching by Giuseppe Vasi (18th century)

- Location within Rome
- Interactive map of Porta Salaria
- 41°54′38.66″N 12°29′53.31″E
- Location: Rome

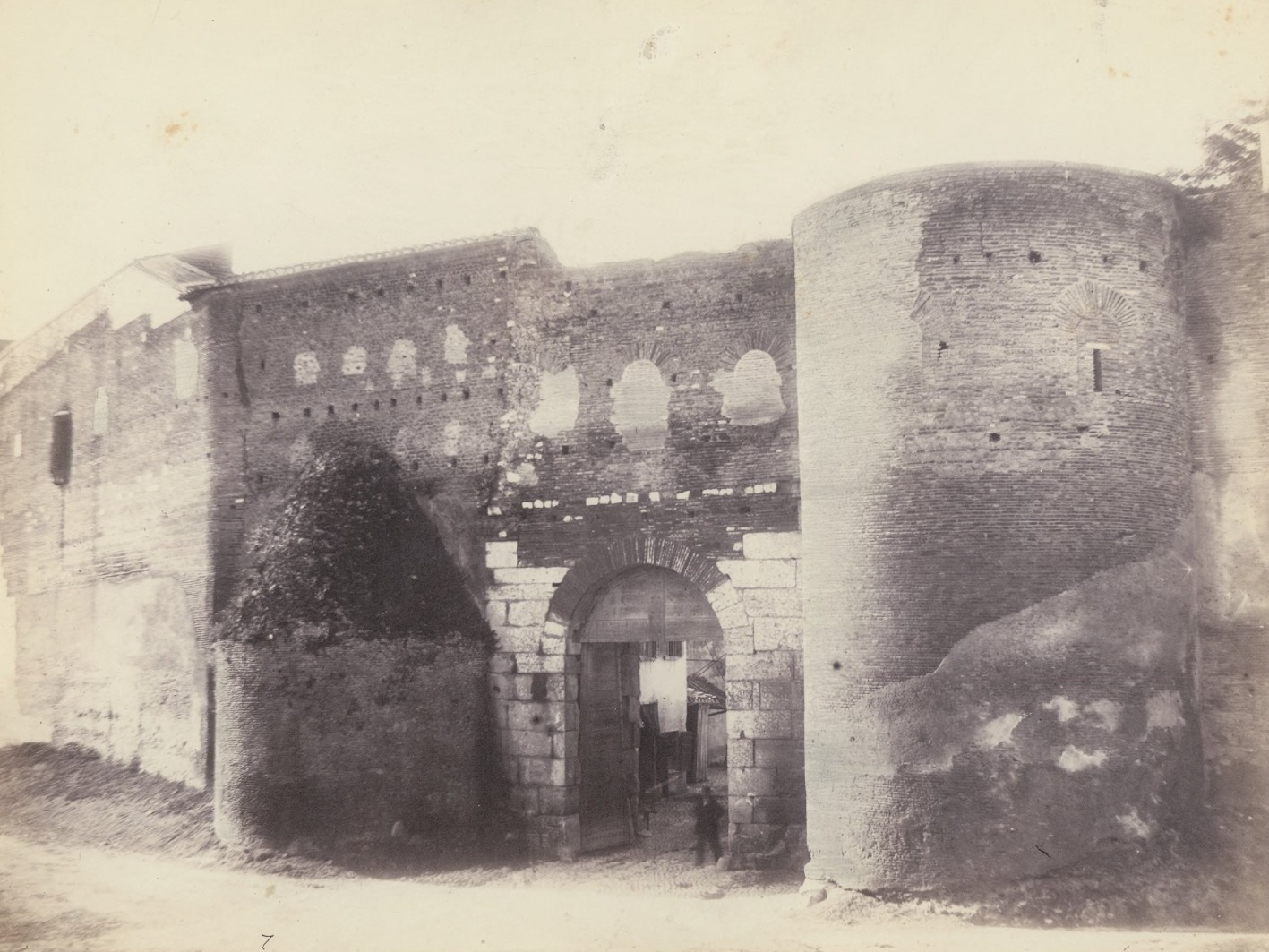
Porta Salaria just before its demolition in 1871.

Porta Salaria was a gate in the Aurelian Walls of Rome, Italy. Constructed between 271 AD and 275 AD, it was demolished in 1921.

== History ==
Porta Salaria was part of the Aurelian Walls built by emperor Aurelian in the 3rd century, including pre-existing constructions in order to hasten the works. Under it passed the Via Salaria nova, which joined the Via Salaria vetus (Old Via Salaria) outside the city. The gate had a single passage and was flanked by two semi-circular towers. The Horti Sallustiani were located in the city just inside the gate.

During the restoration by emperor Honorius in the early 5th century, the arch was strengthened in opus mixtum, and over it three large windows were opened.

The Goth king Alaric I entered Rome from this gate to begin the famous Sack of Rome. In 537, the area between Porta Salaria and Castro Pretorio was the location of the siege by the Goth king Witigis against the troops of Belisarius.

On September 20, 1870, the part of the Aurelian Walls between Porta Salaria and Porta Pia witnessed the end of the Papal States (see Capture of Rome). The gate was damaged by the artillery fire of the Italian troops, and the following year it was demolished. In 1873, it was rebuilt under the design of the architect Virginio Vespignani.

However, in 1921, it was again decided to demolish the gate to open the area to road traffic. The area is now occupied by Piazza Fiume ("Fiume square").

== Remains ==
The 1921 demolition uncovered several funerary monuments of the sepulchres that flanked the old Via Salaria and that had been reused to erect the towers. A copy of the sepulchre of Quintus Sulpicius Maximus, an 11-year-old boy, is now visible in Piazza Fiume (the original is in the Musei Capitolini).

To the right of the walls near the square are the remains of tombs from the 1st century BC.

== See also ==
- Media related to Porta Salaria (Rome) at Wikimedia Commons
- List of ancient monuments in Rome

== Sources ==
- Ball Platner, Samuel (1929). A Topographical Dictionary of Ancient Rome. Oxford University Press. p. 416.
- Quercioli, Mauro (2005). Le mura e le porte di Roma. Newton Compton.
