= Lucius Calpurnius Piso (consul 27) =

Lucius Calpurnius Piso (born Gnaeus Calpurnius Piso) was the son of Gnaeus Calpurnius Piso (consul 7 BC) and Munatia Plancina. After his father's suicide, he changed his name from Gnaeus to Lucius.

He was a member of the gens Calpurnia, one of Rome's most distinguished senatorial families, and specifically was among the Calpurnii Pisones.

His wife was Licinia, daughter of the consul Marcus Licinius Crassus Frugi. They had two sons, one being Gaius Calpurnius Piso who was the focal figure in the Pisonian conspiracy of AD 65, the most famous and wide-ranging plot against Emperor Nero, and who was ordered to commit suicide.. The other one was Lucius Calpurnius Piso (consul 57), a Roman senator who supported Vitellius during the Year of the Four Emperors and who was killed by supporters of Vespasian in 70 AD.
