= Lucius Calpurnius Piso (consul 57) =

1st century AD Roman senator and consul

Consul of the Roman Republic
- In office January 57 – June 57 Serving with Nero
- Preceded by: Lucius Duvius Avitus and Publius Clodius Thrasea Paetus
- Succeeded by: Nero and L. Caesius Martialis

Personal details
- Born: Unknown
- Died: AD 70 Carthage
- Spouse: Licinia Magna
- Children: Calpurnia

Military service
- Allegiance: Roman Empire

Lucius Calpurnius Piso (died AD 70) was a Roman senator active in the first century AD. During the Year of Four Emperors he was governor of Africa and supported Vitellius. After the death of Vitellius he was killed by supporters of Vespasian.

== Early life ==
Piso was the son of Lucius Calpurnius Piso, who had been forced to change his praenomen from Gnaeus to Lucius due to his father's involvement in a conspiracy against Tiberius. The life of the younger Piso is not well known prior to his accession to consul in 57 as the colleague of Emperor Nero.

Tacitus records an incident in the previous year where a conflict arose between the praetor Vibullius and Antistius Sosianus, the plebeian tribune, over whether to keep imprisoned some disorderly audience members; the Senate ruled against Antistius, and Piso went further and proposed that tribunes would no longer be permitted to try cases in their own houses.

== Offices ==
He served as curator aquarum for Rome from 60 to 63. In the year 62 the emperor Nero appointed Piso, along with Aulus Ducenius Geminus and Pompeius Paullinus, to a commission to manage the public revenues. Then in AD 69, he was picked by the sortition to be proconsul of Africa.

He was a member of the Arval Brethren; although it is not known when he was co-opted into the collegia, Piso is recorded attending the meetings in the years 57, 58, 59, 60 and 63.

Piso had a wife, Licinia Magna; their daughter Calpurnia married Calpurnius Piso Galerianus, the son of Gaius Calpurnius Piso.

== Death ==
Map of the Roman Empire during the Year of the Four Emperors (69)

While governing Roman Africa, the civil war known as the Year of Four Emperors erupted. Both the province and Piso supported Vitellius, who had been proconsul there not long before. The commander of the legion stationed in North Africa, Gaius Calpetanus Rantius Quirinalis Valerius Festus, however, was in secret communication with Vespasian. Following the death of Vitellius, Claudius Sagitta, a prefect of horse, reached Africa. Sagitta told Piso that an order had been issued to put the proconsul to death, that his son-in-law had been executed, and Piso's only hope of safety was to either flee to those supporters of Vitellius who remained in Gaul and Spain, or to defend himself in Carthage; Piso was not moved by this news. Shortly afterwards a messenger, Gaius Licinius Mucianus, arrived as an envoy from Mucianus, a partisan of Vespasian based in Rome, to parlay with Piso. Piso refused to leave his palace, which incensed the local population, who began to riot in the marketplace, demanding that Piso present himself. Piso avoided showing himself to the crowd, but managed to have the messenger brought to him, and on questioning him found that Mucianus had dispatched him to kill him. The proconsul ordered the messenger executed and refused to discharge any duties outside the palace, as an attempt to guard against a repeat of the riot.

When Festus learned of the events in Carthage, he sent a troop of cavalry to murder Piso. Although none of the men knew Piso, he was identified for them by Baebius Massa, whom Tacitus described as "a man even then fatal to the good, and destined often to reappear among the course of the sufferings which he had ere long to endure." With Piso dead Festus was able to take control of the province and openly declared for Vespasian.

Political offices
Preceded by Lucius Duvius Avitus, and Publius Clodius Thrasea Paetus as Suffect consuls	Consul of the Roman Empire; 57 with Nero Claudius Caesar Augustus Germanicus II	Succeeded by Lucius Caesius Martialis as Suffect consul
