= Gaius Calpurnius Piso Crassus Frugi Licinianus =

Roman senator and conspirator (died 118)

Gaius Calpurnius Piso Crassus Frugi Licinianus (died 118) was a Roman senator who lived in the 1st and 2nd centuries. He served as suffect consul for the nundinium January to April 87, replacing the emperor Domitian. Crassus is best known for being suspected of plotting against the emperor Nerva, as a result of which he spent much of the rest of his life exiled from Rome to various locations.

Crassus Frugi came from an old consular Republican family. He could also trace his ancestry to the triumvir Marcus Licinius Crassus, and through an adoption of one of the triumvir's descendants was also a member of the gens Calpurnii; his ancestors included a number of men who had been consuls. Libo Rupilius Frugi, consul suffectus in 88, was his brother. For this reason, John D. Grainger attributes to Crassus Frugi a strong antipathy towards the emperor Nerva, whose ancestry was not as illustrious as his, and the reason he plotted to overthrow Nerva.

Grainger also describes Crassus as not intelligent, and Crassus' attempts to suborn some or all of the Praetorian Guard was soon detected. As Cassius Dio tells the tale, Nerva invited him and his co-conspirators to sit beside him at a spectacle (Grainger suggests the Plebeian Games of November 96), and in full view of the crowd handed them swords, "ostensibly to inspect and see if they were sharp (as was often done), but really in order to show that he did not care even if he died then and there." In effect, Nerva dared them to assassinate him, then and there. Crassus, realizing the futility of that action, backed down. Despite protests for a more severe punishment from the Senate, Nerva then exiled Crassus and his wife to Tarentum.

After Nerva's death and Trajan's ascension to the throne, Crassus and his wife were recalled from exile, but he still proved himself treacherous, and Trajan exiled him again, this time to an island off the coast of Italy. Here Crassus still was when Trajan died in 118, and here he was murdered in the first months of Hadrian's reign. The Historia Augusta reports that Crassus was murdered by the emperor's procurator as he left the island, against the wishes of Hadrian.

Political offices
Preceded by Domitian XIII, and Lucius Volusius Saturninus	Suffect consul of the Roman Empire; 87 with Lucius Volusius Saturninus	Succeeded by Gaius Bellicius Natalis Gavidius Tebanianus, and Gaius Ducenius Proculus as Suffect consuls
