= Nepos =

Nepos is a Latin word originally meaning "grandson" or "descendant", that evolved with time to signify "nephew". The word gives rise to the term nepotism.

It may also refer to:

- Cornelius Nepos, a Roman biographer
- Julius Nepos, sometimes considered the last Emperor of the Western Roman Empire
- Aulus Platorius Nepos, governor of Britannia under Hadrian
- Nepos (Roman governor), during the reign of the emperor Trajan
- Quintus Caecilius Metellus Nepos (consul 57 BC), a Roman politician
- The apocryphal Book of Nepos, written by an Egyptian bishop of the same name
- Nepos, a village in Feldru Commune, Bistriţa-Năsăud County, Romania
- Jakob Näf, a literary collaborator of Erasmus in Basel
- Abbreviation of nepotists, such as in the term "nepo baby"

== See also ==
- Nepo (disambiguation)
