= Manius Acilius Glabrio Gnaeus Cornelius Severus =

2nd century Roman senator and consul

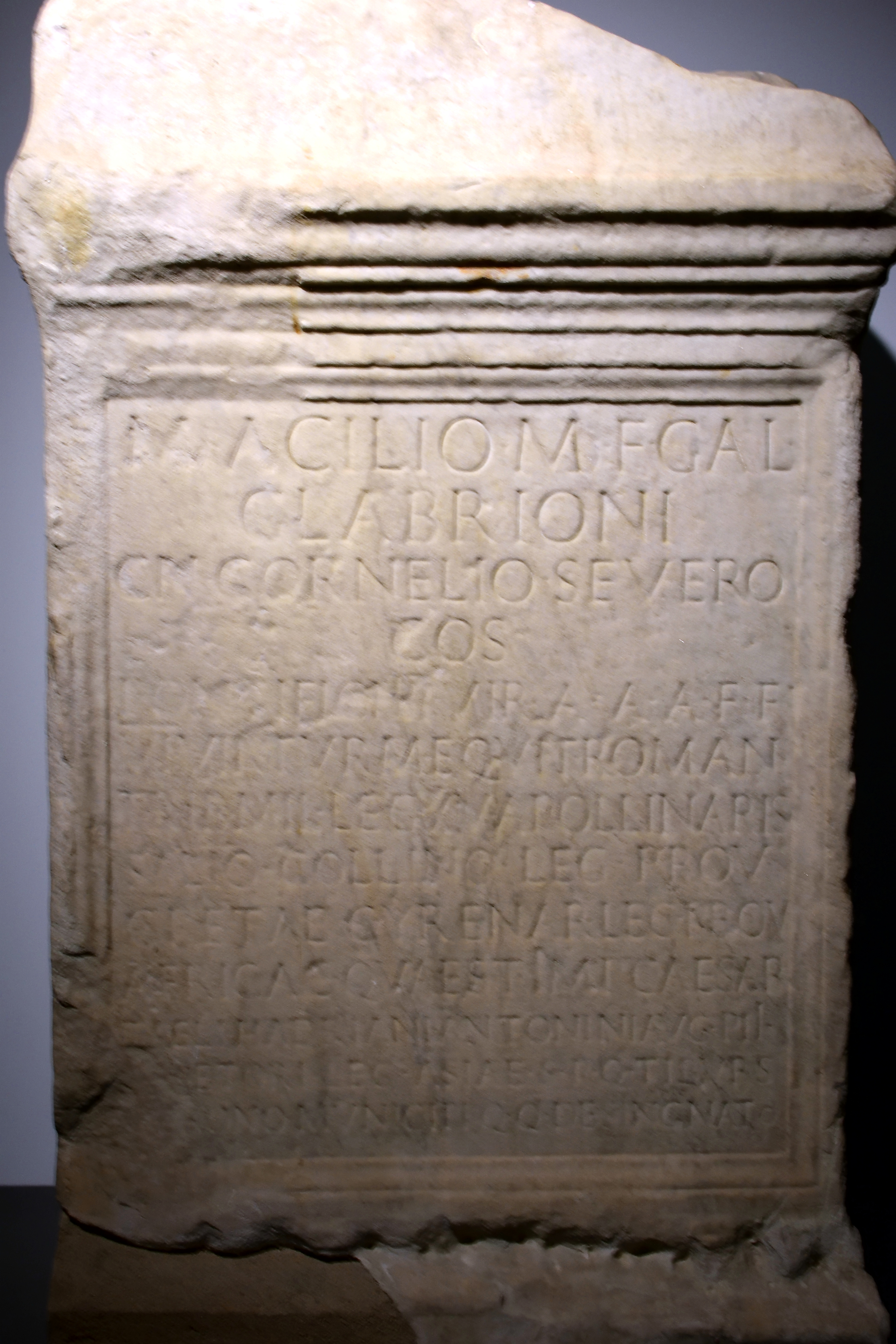
Inscription of Manius Acilius Glabrio Gnaeus Cornelius Severus (CIL XIV, 4237)

Manius Acilius Glabrio Gnaeus Cornelius Severus (born c. 119 - after 177) was a senator of the Roman Empire. He was consul ordinarius in 152 with Marcus Valerius Homullus as his colleague. Acilius Glabrio is known almost solely from surviving inscriptions.

== Ancestry and birth ==
Assuming that he was appointed consul ordinarius anno suo, Acilius Glabrio was born in 119. He belonged to the Acilii Glabriones, a family that first gained prominence during Republican times. Although it had been a Plebeian family during the Republic, by Acilius Glabrio's lifetime it had been granted Patrician status.

His father was Manius Acilius Glabrio, consul in 124; and his grandfather was Manius Acilius Glabrio, consul in 91.

Acilius Glabrio's name presents a problem, due to its polyonymous nature. In short, he has multiple names—"Manius Acilius Glabrio" and "Gnaeus Cornelius Severus"—which is baffling to anyone more familiar with the tria nomina of the Late Republic and Early Empire. This polyonomy can be explained one of three ways:

1. he was born Cn. Cornelius Severus and adopted by M'. Acilius Glabrio, based on the common custom of putting the name of his adoptive father before his natural father's; or
2. he was born M'. Acilius Glabrio and adopted by a Gnaeus Cornelius Severus (in this case, most likely the consul of 112, based on the less common custom of putting the name of his natural father before his adopted father's); or
3. his mother was the daughter of Cn. Cornelius Severus, consul 112, and he attached her name to the end of his father's out of respect for her family, which was an increasingly common custom in the second century.

Each of these possible interpretations have their advocates: Monique Dondin-Payre has argued that he was the natural son of Cornelius Severus; on the other hand, Ronald Syme advocates the interpretation his mother was the daughter of the consul, giving her a hypothetical but unattested name Cornelia Severa; although Olli Salomies endorses Syme's choice, he points out that the daughter of the consul of 112 is known to have been named Cornelia Manliola, and that there were two "Acilia Manliola": one he identifies as Acilius Glabrio's daughter, the other as his great-granddaughter.

== Career ==
His career is known through a surviving inscription, CIL XIV, 4237. It records a cursus honorum that Edward Champlin considered unusual for a patrician, and Ronald Syme wrote "presents abnormal features" and elaborates: "The patrician senator never sees an army; he accedes to the fasces at the age of thirty two or soon after; and he may not bother to leave the shores of Italy until the sortition (discretely managed) awards Asia or Africa fourteen or fifteen years later."

His career as a senator began in a predictable fashion, as a triumvir monetalis, about which Syme notes, "No patrician in this epoch held any of the other three minor magistracies." However, his next office was unusual: Acilius Glabrio saw service as a military tribune of Legio XV Apollinaris. After Trajan became emperor, only one other patrician is known to have served as a military tribune, Publius Manilius Vopiscus Vicinillianus, consul of 114. Then he was praetorian legate twice—the first as the adjunct to the governor of Crete and Cyrenaica, the other to the proconsul of Africa—prior to becoming quaestor.

Syme examined the context of his posting. He notes that in 137 (the year Syme concludes Acilius Glabrio served with the Legio XV Apollinaris) the governor of the province that the legion was stationed in was Flavius Arrianus, who dedicated his Tacitica to the current emperor, Hadrian; Syme also notes that 137 was an unsettled year towards the end of Hadrian's reign, when intrigue surrounded his selection of a successor. "A prudent father would do well if he removed his young son beyond ... [its] reach." Syme also notes that while stationed in Cappadocia, Acilius Glabrio granted Roman citizenship to the family of Acilius Diodotus, a sophist from Caesarea (modern Kayseri).

Little can be said about his time in Crete and Cyrenaica: the governor when he was in the province, 138/139, is not known. However, Syme proposes that when Acilius Glabrio was in Africa, 139/140, the proconsul of Africa at the time was his father, Manius Acilius Glabrio. Syme concludes his father's influence was present throughout this part of his life.

After his consulship Acilius Glabrio was proconsul of Africa in his own right between AD 164 and 168. That he was one of the witnesses to the Tabula Banasitana (AE 1971, 534) shows he was still alive on 6 July 177.

== Family ==
According to a partly preserved gravestone CIL XIV, 2484, his wife's name was Faustina; the inscription memorializes two daughters: Faustina Aciliana (died aged 13 years, 2 months and 11 days) and Priscilla Aciliana (also died young). It is possible they had another daughter, Acilia, who was the mother of Tiberius Claudius Cleobulus. They are known to have had two sons, Manius Acilius Glabrio, twice consul; and Manius Acilius Faustinus, suffect consul in 179.

Champlin suggests that, based on her name, Faustina was a descendant of the wife of Marcus Annius Verus—more specifically, Ummidia Cornificia Faustina, the niece of Emperor Marcus Aurelius. However, Syme raises two objections to this identification. His first is that Ummidia Cornificia was much too young to be married to Acilius Glabrio: her parents were married in 136, and her presumed oldest son was consul for the second time in 186. His second is that, "[i]f Glabrio had married a cousin or a niece of Marcus, it is strange that, surviving his consulate by a quarter of a century, he was able to avoid a second tenure of the fasces."

Political offices
Preceded by Gaius Curtius Justus; Publius Julius Nauto as suffecti	Roman consul 152 with Marcus Valerius Homullus	Succeeded by Publius Sufenas; Lucius Dasumius Tullius Tuscus as suffecti
