= Lucius Atilius =

Lucius Atilius may refer to:

- Lucius Atilius (jurist), jurist of ancient Rome
- Lucius Atilius (tribune 311 BC), politician of ancient Rome
