= Publius Tullius Varro =

2nd century Roman general and senator

Publius Tullius Varro was a Roman general and senator during the reign of Hadrian. The commander of two different legions during his career, one of his most important military roles was as commander of Legio VI Victrix during its transfer from Vetera in Germania Inferior to York in Roman Britain in AD 122.

== Life ==
Varro was a native of Tarquinii in Etruria. Anthony Birley wrote that "he had excellent connections in high places for his elder brother had been adopted, it would seem, by the influential Spaniard Dasumius, taking the names P. Dasumius Rusticus", indicating his brother was consul ordinarius in 119 as the colleague of the emperor Hadrian. However, it appears that Birley's understanding of this relationship was based on a misunderstanding of an inscription known as the Testamentum Dasumii, which had led experts to conclude that Tullius Varro was the friend of its testator whose son that person would adopt, and the adoptee would be known by the name L. Dasumius Tullius Tuscus. Once it was clear that the testator of this inscription was not "Dasumius", this reconstruction lapses. While it is possible that the man who adopted Varro's natural son was related to Dasumius Rusticus, he has no further relationship to Varro.

Varro's career began in the vigintivirate as a member of the decemviri stlitibus judicandis. He then received his first military commission, as the tribunus laticlavius of Legio XVI Flavia Firma, which was stationed at Satala at the time. He returned to Rome, where he was elected quaestor urbanus, and after his praetorship, Varro was assigned his first legion to command, Legio XII Fulminata which was stationed in the border province of Cappadocia. The sortition awarded him proconsular governor of Hispania Baetica which he held for a year, and Birley speculates that it may have been while he held this post that he came to the attention of Hadrian, who assigned Varro the "delicate" job of uprooting Legio VI Victrix from its long-term home and relocating it to Britain.

His command of a second legion was followed by a term as prefect of the aerarium Saturni, or public treasury, after which Varro was appointed suffect consul in 127 with Junius Paetus as his colleague. After his consulship, Varro's subsequent offices were curator alvei Tiber, governor of Moesia Superior from 135 to 137, and Proconsul of Africa from 142 to 143. Birley notes that Varro's "social standing is demonstrated by his having been an augur."

== Family ==
Due to a number of facts, it is generally accepted that the suffect consul of 152, Lucius Dasumius Tullius Tuscus, is Varro's biological son. The elements "Lucius Dasumius" were added to the son's name from his adoptive father's whom Salomies notes was "certainly related" to Publius Dasumius Rusticus.

Political offices
Preceded by Titus Atilius Rufus Titianus, and Marcus Gavius Squilla Gallicanus as ordinary consuls	Suffect consul of the Roman Empire; AD 127 with Junius Paetus	Succeeded by Quintus Tineius Rufus, and Marcus Licinius Celer Nepos as suffect consuls
Preceded by Sextus Julius Major	Proconsul of Africa; 142 – 143	Succeeded by Lucius Minicius Natalis Quadronius Verus
