= Gavia gens =

Family in ancient Rome

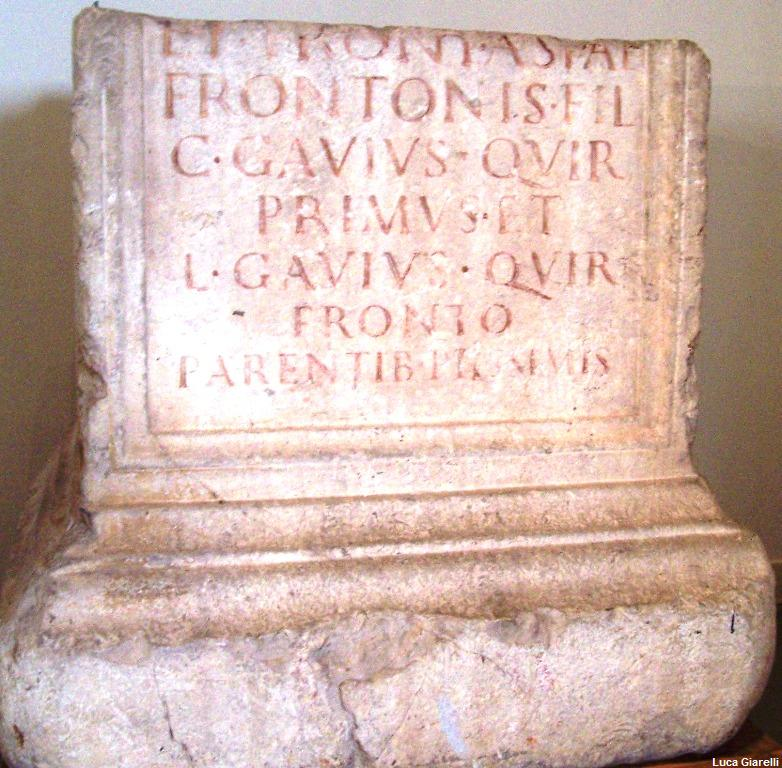
Inscription from Malegno in Archeological museum of Valle Camonica, Cividate Camuno, which names two of the Gavii.

The gens Gavia, or occasionally Gabia, was a Roman family of plebeian descent. It first appears in history during the first century BC, but none of its members obtained any of the curule magistracies until imperial times. The Gavi Arch at Verona was built in honor of one of the Gavii.

== Origin ==
As a nomen, Gavius is a patronymic surname, derived from the praenomen Gavius. In historical times, this praenomen was used by the Oscan-speaking peoples of central and southern Italy, suggesting that the Gavii were originally of Sabine or Samnite origin; one of the most famous persons with this praenomen was Gavius Pontius, a Samnite general during the Second Samnite War.

But as with other patronymic surnames, there may originally have been several unrelated families bearing the same nomen, and some of these could also have been of Latin origin; Gavius is thought to be the original form of Gaius, one of the most common praenomina in every period of Roman history. That name is derived from an ancient root meaning "to rejoice". As it is impossible to distinguish between different families of Gavii with absolute certainty, all persons bearing this nomen are collected here.

== Members ==
- Publius Gavius, an inhabitant of Cosa, whom Verres had crucified, on suspicion of aiding Spartacus.
- Titus Gavius Caepio, described by Cicero as a wealthy aristocrat. During the Civil War, his son was a military tribune under Bibulus in Syria.
- Lucius Gavius, an agent of Brutus in Cappadocia when Cicero was proconsul of Cilicia, from 51 to 50 BC. At Brutus' request, Cicero offered Gavius a prefecture, but found him very disrespectful, and referred to him as Clodius' dog. He may be the same person as the Gavius of Firmum previously mentioned by Cicero.
- Gavius (or Gabius) Bassus, a Latin grammarian in the time of Cicero. His Commentarii and Origine Verborum et Vocabulorum were cited by Aulus Gellius. He is probably the same Gavius who was the author of De Diis, discussed by Macrobius, and may have authored the Satirae quoted by Fabius Planciades Fulgentius.
- Gavius Silo, an orator heard by Augustus in 26 BC, according to Seneca the Elder.
- Gaius Gavius C. f. Macer, quaestor in AD 19.
- Marcus Gavius (or Gabius) Apicius, a celebrated gourmand during the reign of Tiberius, he squandered his fortune in the pursuit of new culinary horizons, and became the subject of numerous anecdotes and proverbs.
- Marcus Gavius P. f. Bassus, prefect of the Pontic coast during the reign of Trajan. Although sometimes identified with the grammarian, he is unlikely to have been the same person, as the grammarian related having seen the horse Sejanus, which had belonged to Publius Cornelius Dolabella, Gaius Cassius Longinus, and Marcus Antonius, a century and a half earlier.
- Gaius Gavius Silvanus, tribune under Nero.
- Quintus Gavius Atticus, consul suffectus in AD 73.
- Marcus Gavius Squilla Gallicanus, consul in AD 127, was the father of Gallicanus and Orfitus, consuls in AD 150 and 165.
- Marcus Gavius M. f. Squilla Gallicanus, consul in AD 150.
- Marcus Gavius Maximus, Praetorian prefect under Antoninus Pius.
- Marcus Gavius M. f. Orfitus, consul in AD 165.
- Marcus Gavius M. f. Cornelius Cethegus, consul in AD 170.
- Marcus Gavius Appalius Maximus, governor of Lycia et Pamphylia from about 182 to 184.
- Lucius Fulvius Gavius Numisius Petronius Aemilianus, consul in AD 206.
- Lucius Fulvius Gavius Numisius Aemilianus, consul in AD 249.

== See also ==
- List of Roman gentes

== Bibliography ==
- Marcus Tullius Cicero, In Verrem, Epistulae ad Atticum.
- Gaius Plinius Caecilius Secundus (Pliny the Younger), Epistulae.
- Aulus Gellius, Noctes Atticae (Attic Nights).
- Ambrosius Theodosius Macrobius, Saturnalia.
- Fabius Planciades Fulgentius, Sermonum Antiquorum Explicatio (The Explanation of Antique Words).
- Dictionary of Greek and Roman Biography and Mythology, William Smith, ed., Little, Brown and Company, Boston (1849).
- Theodor Mommsen et alii, Corpus Inscriptionum Latinarum (The Body of Latin Inscriptions, abbreviated CIL), Berlin-Brandenburgische Akademie der Wissenschaften (1853–present).
- René Cagnat et alii, L'Année épigraphique (The Year in Epigraphy, abbreviated AE), Presses Universitaires de France (1888–present).
- George Davis Chase, "The Origin of Roman Praenomina", in Harvard Studies in Classical Philology, vol. VIII (1897).
- Anthony R. Birley, Marcus Aurelius, revised ed., Routledge, London (1987).
- Géza Alföldy, Konsulat und Senatorenstand unter den Antoninen, Habelt Verlag, Bonn (1977).
- Rémy Bernard, Les carrières sénatoriales dans les provinces romaines d'Anatolie au Haut-Empire (31 av. J.-C. - 284 ap. J.-C.) ("Senatorial Careers from the Roman Provinces of Anatolia during the High Empire (31 BC–AD 284"), Institut Français d'Études Anatoliennes-Georges Dumézil, Istanbul (1989).
