= William Seston =

French historian and epigrapher (1900–1983)

- Born: 2 June 1900; Lasalle (Gard)
- Died: 2 October 1983 (aged 83); Mazamet
- Occupations: Historian; Epigrapher

William Seston (2 June 1900 – 2 October 1983) was a 20th-century French historian and epigrapher, a specialist of the history of the Roman Empire. He was professor at the Sorbonne and a member of the Académie des Inscriptions et Belles-Lettres.

== Biography ==
The son of a Protestant pastor, William Seston was a student of the École Normale Supérieure where he was formed by Jérôme Carcopino. A professor of history and geography, he became a member of the École française de Rome in 1926. In 1927 he participated in the excavation of the Rapidum camp in Djouab in the former Numidia in today Algeria. After teaching in high schools in Nîmes and Marseille, he obtained a position at the University of Strasbourg in 1929. In 1935 he was appointed to the University of Bordeaux, where he directed the Revue des études anciennes. Called in Montpellier (1941) and Toulouse (1942), he became head of the then newly created division of historical antiquities. He then joined the Sorbonne in 1944 before holding the chair of Roman history in 1949, and ended his career as Director of Ancient History Research Center. When he left in 1969, his post was taken over by André Chastagnol. In 1970 he became a member of the Académie des Inscriptions et Belles-Lettres.

His thesis on Diocletian and the Tetrarchy profoundly influenced the historiography of the Lower Empire. An historian highly attentive to law, he made important contributions to the study of Roman citizenship, particularly through the publication of Tabula Banasitana.

His colleagues, friends and students offered him a volume of Festschrift in 1974

== Publications (selection) ==
=== Books ===
- 1946: Dioclétien et la tétrarchie, thesis
- 1980: Scripta Varia. Mélanges d'histoire romaine, de droit, d'épigraphie et d'histoire du christianisme, Publication de l'École française de Rome, Rome, 1980 Read online

=== Articles ===
- 1931: « L'empereur Claude et les chrétiens », Revue d'histoire et de philosophie religieuse, 11, p. 40-73.
- 1932: « La libération des légionnaires romains d'après un papyrus récemment publié », Comptes rendus des scéances de l'Académie des Inscriptions et Belles-Lettres (CRAI), 76-3, p. 311-313.
- 193: « Remarques sur le rôle de la pensée d'Origène dans les origines du monachisme », Revue d'histoire et de philosophie religieuse, 13, p. 197-213.
- 1934: Le monastère d'Aïn-Tamda et les origines de l'architecture monastique en Afrique du Nord, MEFR, 51-1, p. 79-113; Extrait des Mélanges de l'École française de Rome, De Boccard, Paris, 34 p.
- 1938: « Achilleus et la révolte de l'Égypte sous Dioclétien, d'après les papyrus et l'Histoire Auguste », MEFR, 55-1, p. 184-200, currently in Scripta Varia, Rome, 1980, p. 423-439.
- 1939: « Le Roi sassanide Narsès, les Arabes et le manichéisme », Mélanges syriens offerts à R. Dussaud, p. 227-234, now in Scripta Varia, Rome, 1980, p. 561-568 Read online.
- 1946: « Hypothése sur la date de la basilique constantinieme de Saint-Pierre de Rome », Cahiers d'archéologie, 2, p. 153-159.
- 1947: in collaboration with Charles Perrat, « La basilique funéraire païenne de Saint-Irénée de Lyon », Revue des Études Anciennes, 49, p. 139-159.
- 1950: « La table de Bronze de Magliano et la réforme électorale d'Auguste », CRAI, p. 105-111 (now in Scripta Varia, Rome, 1980, p. 133-140 Read online.
- 1954: « Le Clipeus virtutis d'Arles et la composition des Res Gestae Divi Augusti », CRAI, 98-3, p. 286-297 now in Scripta Varia, Rome, 1980, p. 121-132.
- 1961: with Maurice Euzennat, « La citoyenneté romaine au temps de Marc Aurèle et de Commode, d'après la Tabula Banasitana », CRAI, 105-2, p. 317-324. Read online.
- 1967: « Remarques sur les institutions politiques et sociales de Carthage, d'après une inscription latine de Thugga », CRAI, 111-2, p. 218-223.
- 1973: « La Citoyenne romaine », XIIIe Congrès International des sciences historiques, (Moscow, 16–23 October 1970), Moscow, p. 31-52, now in Scripta Varia, Rome, 1980, p. 3-18 Read online.
- 1971: with Maurice Euzennat, « Un dossier de la chancellerie romaine : La Tabula Banasitana. Etude de diplomatique », 115-3, CRAI, p. 468-490. Read online.
- 1976: « Le droit au service de l'impérialisme romain », CRAI, p. 637-647.
- 1978: « La lex Julia de 90 av. J.-C. et l'intégration des Italiens dans la citoyenneté romaine », CRAI, p. 529-542.

=== Published lessons ===
- Les institutions et la vie politique à Rome sous les Flaviens et les Antonins, U.N.E.F., Paris, 1965, 3 fascicules : 46 p., 35 p., 58 p.
- Le monde romain au 3e siècle : cours de M. Seston 1964-1965, U.N.E.F., Paris, sans date, 3 fascicules : 30 p., 54 p., 19 p.

=== Direction d'ouvrages ===
- Fernand Chapouthier, William Seston, Pierre Boyancé éd., Mélanges d'études anciennes offerts à Georges Radet, directeur de la Revue des études anciennes,/ par les collaborateurs de la revue, 1940.
- J. Heurgon, G. Picard, W. Seston, Mélanges d'archéologie, d'épigraphie et d'histoire offerts à Jérome Carcopino,1966.

== Bibliography ==
- Charles Pietri, « William Seston (1900-1983) », MEFRA, 95-2, 1983, p. 535-539 Read online
- Paul-Marie Duval, « Allocution à l'occasion du décès de M. William Seston, membre de l'Académie », CRAI, 127-3, 1983, p. 463-467 Read online
