= Lucius Trebius Germanus =

Roman British governor

Lucius Trebius Germanus was a governor of Roman Britain in 127, and suffect consul with Gaius Calpurnius Flaccus, the proconsul of Cyprus in 123, at an uncertain date. He is known from a military diploma published in 1997 that bears the date 20 August 127.

Anthony Birley provides further information on Trebius Germanus. He is mentioned in the Digest, which cites a legal decision Trebius Germanus made while governor of an unnamed province, not necessarily Roman Britain, condemning a slave boy to death for failing to call for help when his owner was murdered. Birley also notes that Trebius Germanus is a member of a small group of three consuls appointed to the office in a ten-year period who share the same gentilicium -- the others being Gaius Trebius Maximus (suffect consul 121 or 122) and Gaius Trebius Sergianus (consul 132) -- while adding Ronald Syme's observations that "'the obscure Trebii... are the first and last consuls of that name'; elsewhere he called them 'a unique and isolated group'". Birley speculates on the place of origin for these three consulars, finding less prominent Trebii attested in Italy, Spain, Gaul, and Dalmatia, but preferring none of these.

Birley offers a few more speculations about Trebius Germanus. He suggests that his tenure as governor followed immediately on his predecessor, Aulus Platorius Nepos, and lasted three years from 125 to 127; the military diploma would date from towards the end of his tenure. Birley also suggests that he may be the governor in whose name a broken and now lost inscription found at Bewcastle was made. Prior to the discovery of this military diploma, Birley had speculated it might have contained the name of the other three governors then attested under Hadrian -- Nepos, Julius Severus, and Mummius Sisenna, or another consular, Gaius Nonius Proculus, who held the consulship in some undetermined nundinium between AD 50 and 150.

Preceded by Aulus Platorius Nepos	Roman governors of Britain	Succeeded by Uncertain, then Sextus Julius Severus
