= Marcus Valerius Homullus =

Marcus Valerius Homullus (birth and death dates unknown) was a Roman Senator of the second century. In 152 he was consul ordinarius with Manius Acilius Glabrio Gnaeus Cornelius Severus. He informed against Marcus Aurelius and Marcus' mother Domitia Lucilla to Antoninus Pius, but nothing came of that according to the Historia Augusta ("Marcus", vi.9). (Note: "...quamvis non deessent, qui aliqua adversum eum insusurrarent, et prae ceteris Valerius Homullus, qui, cum Lucillam matrem Marci in virdiario venerantem simulacrum Apollinis vidisset, insusurravit: 'Illa nunc rogat, ut diem tuum claudas, et filius imperet', quod omnino apud Pium nihil valuit.")

On another occasion, Antoninus was visiting the house of Homullus admired some porphyry columns, asking if they had come from the imperial quarries. Homullus replied "when you enter another man's house you should be deaf and dumb." This remark has been variously interpreted as a good-natured jab at a friend or as a slap at the Emperor.

Homullus was the patron of the city of Capua in Campania.

== Notes ==
Political offices
Preceded by Gaius Curtius Justus, and Publius Julius Nauto as suffect consuls	Consul of the Roman Empire; 152 with Manius Acilius Glabrio Gnaeus Cornelius Severus	Succeeded by Publius Sufenas, and Lucius Dasumius Tullius Tuscus as suffect consuls
