= Lucius Minicius Natalis Quadronius Verus =

Roman military leader and statesman (born 96)

- Proconsul of Africa
- Reign: 153-154
- Born: February 96

Lucius Minicius Natalis Quadronius Verus (born in Barcino, AD 96) was a Roman statesman and military leader who served as the Proconsul of Africa from 153 to 154. He was the first known Olympic champion to have been born in the Iberian Peninsula.

== Early life ==
Minicius was born in February 96. His father, Lucius Minicius Natalis, originally a plebeian, achieved significant civilian and military positions in Numidia, Dacia, and Pannonia during the reigns of Trajan and Hadrian, for which accomplishments the older Minicius was adlected into the Senate. Minicius was raised in Barcino, modern-day Barcelona, in Hispania Tarraconensis.

His first public office of note was as one of the tresviri monetales, the most prestigious of the four boards that comprise the vigintiviri; assignment to this board was usually allocated to patricians or favored individuals, and as the son of one of Trajan's successful generals, the second rationale best fits Minicius' case.

== Military service ==
Minicius had a remarkable career as a military tribune, serving in three different legions, "a feat for which the career of Hadrian offers the only parallel," according to Anthony Birley. All three legions were stationed on the Danubian frontier: he served in Legio I Adiutrix around 115, Legio XI Claudia at Moesia around 115, and Legio XIV Gemina at Carnuntum around 116. Birley notes that his father was governor of Dacia at the same time (113-117) Minicius served in the XIV Gemina. He played an important role in the conquest of Dacia.

Upon his return to Rome, he was appointed to serve as quaestor to emperor Hadrian; about the same time he assumed the priestly office of augur, "a further indication," Birley notes, "of his high social standing, and of the influential patronage which he enjoyed." Minicius was allowed to serve as legate to his father while the older Minicius governed Africa; Ronald Syme dates his office to 121. This was followed by the office of plebeian tribune as the candidatus of the emperor. After reaching the office of praetor, around 130 he was appointed legatus legionis or commander of the Legio VI Victrix in Britain. Birley speculates that he owed this command to the recommendation of Sextus Julius Severus, governor of Roman Britain. "Normally, governors seem to have had no say in the appointment of legionary legates, but Hadrian may have been prepared to waive regulations in exceptional cases," Birley adds.

== Athletic career ==
Following his tenure as praetor, in 129 Minicius decided to participate in the Olympic Games in Greece. To do so, he traveled to Tarraco, the largest city in Hispania Tarraconensis, where Roman chariot races to qualify for the Olympic Games were being held. Minicius hired the best chariot driver who won the race and, therefore, qualified to go to Greece. He went on to win the chariot race in the 227th Olympiad.

== Public service ==
After returning to Rome, Minicius enjoyed a career Birley describes as "while not spectacular, was distinguished." was appointed praefectus alimentorum, then curator of the Via Flaminia. He was then appointed suffect consul in 139 with Lucius Claudius Proculus as his colleague. From around 142 to 145 he served as governor of Moesia Inferior. Minicius served as the Proconsul of Africa from 153 to 154.

== Legacy ==
External image
- Plate honoring Lucius Minicius on display at the Archaeology Museum of Catalonia

Lucius Minicius was the patron of Barcino, his hometown. In 125 he donated a spa town to the city with aqueducts built on the property. Traces of these baths were found under the plaça de Sant Miquel, a town square in Barcelona. Two plates honoring him were found and placed on exposition at the Archaeology Museum of Catalonia. On the anniversary of his birth Lucius Minicius made monetary contributions to the city. In his honor, the Generalitat of Catalonia constituted a medal awarded to Olympic athletes from Catalonia. The city of Barcelona named an area in his honor at Montjuïc, an Olympic venue.

== Bibliography ==
- CIL XIV, 3599 = ILS 1061
- CIL II, 4510
- CIL XI, 3002
- CIL XI, 2925 = ILS 3221
- AE 1979, 374

Political offices
Preceded by Antoninus Pius II; G. Bruttius Praesens L. Fulvius Rusticus II	Consul of the Roman Empire; July–August 139 with L. Claudius Proculus	Succeeded by ignotus, and G. Julius Scapula as suffect consuls
Preceded by Publius Tullius Varro	Proconsul of Africa; 153–154	Succeeded by L. Hedius Rufus Lollianus Avitus
