= Titus Atilius Rufus Titianus =

2nd century Roman senator and consul

Titus Atilius Rufus Titianus was a Roman senator, who was active during the first half of the second century AD. He was consul ordinarius in the year 127 with Marcus Gavius Squilla Gallicanus as his colleague. Paul von Rohden has suggested Titianus may be the son of Titus Atilius Rufus, suffect consul in some nundinium before the year 80. Nevertheless, Titianus was a member of the gens Atilia.

His name was stamped on a length of lead pipe found at Antium, indicating he owned a building in that city.

Except for holding the consulate, nothing is known of Titianus' cursus honorum. The author of the Historia Augusta states Titianus was the only usurper during the reign of Antoninus Pius, although later in the same passage Cornelius Priscianus is mentioned as also having attempted to usurp the throne, only to fail and end his life; according to the Historia Augusta, as a sign of his clemency Pius handed Titianus over to the Senate to punish, while forbidding any investigation of his fellow conspirators and preventing Titianus' unnamed son from being prosecuted for his father's crime. He may also be the conspirator Titianus mentioned by the author of the Historia Augusta in the life of Hadrian, who misplaced Titianus from confusion.

Political offices
Preceded by Lucius Cuspius Camerinus, and Gaius Saenius Severus as suffect consul	Suffect consul of the Roman Empire; 127 with Marcus Gavius Squilla Gallicanus	Succeeded by Publius Tullius Varro, and Junius Paetus as suffect consul
