= Quintus Tineius Rufus (consul 127) =

2nd century Roman senator, consul and governor

Quintus Tineius Rufus, also known as Turnus Rufus the Evil (Hebrew: טוּרְנוּסְרוּפוּס הָרָשָׁע Ṭūrnūsrūfūs hāRāšā‘, sometimes spelled טוֹרָנוּסְרוּפוּס Ṭōrānūsrūfūs) in Jewish sources (c. 90 AD – after 131 AD) was a Roman politician who served as senator and provincial governor in the Roman Empire. He is known for his role in unsuccessfully combating the early uprising phase of the Jews under Simon bar Kokhba and Elasar.

== Life ==
In Jerome's Latin version of The Chronicle of Eusebius, Tineius Rufus is called Tinnio Rufo (a variant of T. Annio Rufo). O. Salomies identifies Rufus' place of origin as the Etruscan town of Volterra, despite an inscription mentioning Q. Tineius Q.f. Sab. Her[mes] in Nicomedia. Rufus was legatus Augusti pro praetore or governor of Thracia from 123 to 126, after which he was made Consul suffectus for the nundinium of May to September 127.

A few years after he stepped down from the consulship, Rufus was appointed consular legate of Judaea, during which time he is said to have ordered the execution of the Jewish leader Rabbi Akiva in Caesarea. Rufus' tenure ended a period of ten years following Lusius Quietus' governorship where, until recently, little was known of the provincial governors; an Aquila is recorded as governor during those years, but when he governed or his full identity is not clear. In November 2016, an inscription in Greek was recovered off the coast of Dor in Israel by Haifa University underwater archaeologists, which attests that Antiquus was governor of the province of Judea sometime between 120 and 130, prior to the Bar Kokhba revolt. Rufus' tenure began in 130 and continued to 133.

Quintus Tineius Rufus is known for his role in unsuccessfully combating the early uprising phase of the Jews under Simon bar Kokhba and Elasar. The Church Fathers and rabbinic literature emphasize his role in provoking the revolt. Rufus is last recorded in 132; whether he died or was replaced is uncertain.

Tinnius Rufus asked: "Which is the more beautiful—God's work or man's?" Rabbi Akiva replied: "Undoubtedly man's work is the better, for while nature at God's command supplies us only with the raw material, human skill enables us to elaborate the same according to the requirements of art and good taste." Rufus had hoped to drive Akiva into a corner by his strange question; for he expected quite a different answer and intended to compel Akiva to admit the wickedness of circumcision. He then put the question, "Why has God not made man just as He wanted him to be?" Akiva had an answer ready: "For the very reason, the duty of man is to perfect himself."

== Offspring and legacy ==
Quintus Rufus took a woman named Claudia Rufina as a wife, and had a daughter and a son, Quintus Tineius Sacerdos Clemens, who became Consul in 158 and later one of the pontifices. It is also said that once Tinneis Rufus complained to his wife Rufina, that R. Akiva teased him to the Roman rulers. His wife suggested that he throw R. Akiva out of the trap by seducing him. She tried it, but did not succeed. When she came to R. Akiva, he spit, laughed and cried. When she asked him to reconcile his words, he replied, spitting, since she came from a putrid drop. He laughed, did not answer her, since the reason was, that she would marry him in the future. And cried, that all her beauty would be spent after her death. Later, Rufina asked Rabbi Akiva if she could repent, and when he answered that she did, she converted to Judaism. It may have been because of his attitude towards life that was different from what she knew. After converting to Judaism, she decided to marry R. Akiva.[9]

In the midrash, miraculous story is presented about the prophet Elijah and Rabbi Yehoshua Hagarsi, the servant of Rabbi Akiva, who took the body of Rabbi Akiva after his execution and laid it down on the bed prepared for him in a hidden burial cave. In the same cave, Rabbi Yehoshua saw a different bed, handsome from Rabbi Akiva's bed, and Eliyahu revealed to him that this bed was intended for Tinneis Rufus' wife for all the good she had done with Rabbi Akiva when he was bandaged in the forbidden house.

His reputation varies, depending on the source; in Jewish tradition, Rufus conducted the war against the Jewish people. However, there is an inscription in his honor in Scythopolis.

== Terentius Rufus ==
According to the Jewish historian Josephus, a certain Terentius Rufus was left to command the Roman army in Jerusalem after the Romans had sacked the city during the First Jewish Revolt. When his arch-enemy Simon bar Giora was eventually caught and brought to him after hiding in a cavern in Jerusalem's Temple Mount, Terentius Rufus ordered that the Temple Mount be ploughed up in hopes of discovering other hideaways from the war. Whether this Terentius Rufus refers to the same Quintus Tineius Rufus who was made Consul suffectus some 59 years later is reasonably doubted.

== Sources ==
- Brill's New Pauly, under "Tineius" [3]

Political offices
Preceded by Publius Tullius Varro, and Junius Paetus as ordinary consuls	Suffect consul of the Roman Empire; AD 127 with Marcus Licinius Celer Nepos	Succeeded by Lucius Aemilius Juncus, and Sextus Julius Severus as suffect consuls
