= Junius Rusticus =

2nd century Roman teacher, politician and Stoic philosopher

Quintus Junius Rusticus
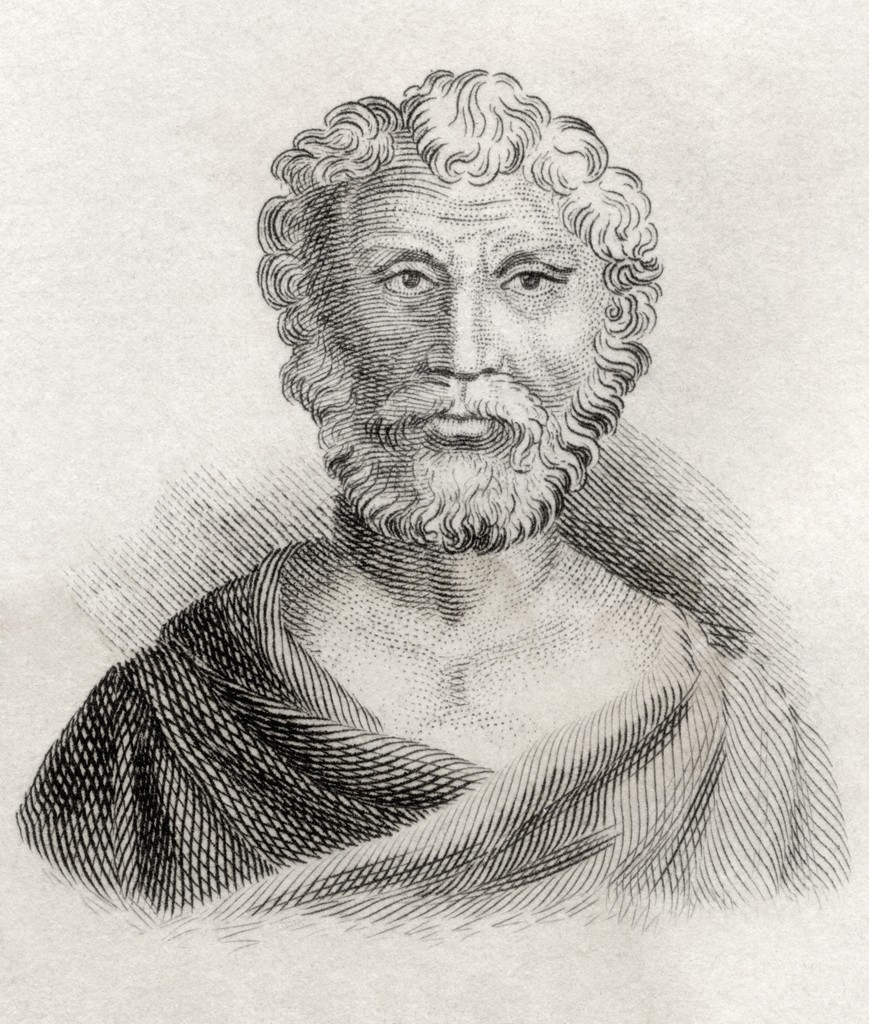
- Quintus Junius Rusticus from Crabb's Historical Dictionary

Suffect Consul of the Roman Empire
- In office c. 133 AD – c. 133 AD

Consul ordinarius of the Roman Empire
- In office c. 162 AD – c. 162 AD
- Preceded by: (?) Julius Geminus Capellianus; Titus Flavius Boethus
- Succeeded by: Tiberius Claudius Paullinus; Tiberius Claudius Pompeianus

Urban Prefect of the Roman Empire
- In office c. 162 AD – c. 168 AD
- Preceded by: Quintus Lollius Urbicus
- Succeeded by: Lucius Sergius Paullus

Personal details
- Born: Quintus Iunius Rusticus c. 100 AD
- Died: c. 170 AD
- Occupation: Ancient Roman politician and philosopher

Quintus Junius Rusticus (c. 100 – c. 170 AD), was a Roman teacher and politician. He was probably a grandson of Arulenus Rusticus, who was a prominent member of the Stoic Opposition. He was a Stoic philosopher and was one of the teachers of the emperor Marcus Aurelius, whom Aurelius treated with the utmost respect and honour.

Rusticus held the political positions of Suffect consul in 133 and Consul ordinarius in 162. He served as urban prefect of Rome between 162 and 168. In this role he is notable for presiding over the trial of the Christian theologian Justin Martyr, which ended with Justin's conviction and execution.

According to Themistius, a 4th-century Roman philosopher and orator, Hadrian, Antoninus, and Marcus Aurelius "pulled Arrian and Rusticus away from their books, refusing to let them be mere pen-and-ink philosophers" and escorted them from the study of Stoic philosophy "to the general’s tent as well as to the speaker’s platform." Themistius lumps Arrian and Rusticus together in recounting their military achievements:

In their role as Roman generals, these men passed through the Caspian Gates, drove the Alani out of Armenia, and established boundaries for the Iberians and the Albani. For all these accomplishments, they reaped the fruits of the eponymous consulship, governed the great city [of Rome], and presided over the ancient senate.

== Influence on Marcus Aurelius ==
The Historia Augusta states that Rusticus was the most important teacher of Marcus Aurelius:

[Marcus] received most instruction from Junius Rusticus, whom he ever revered and whose disciple he became, a man esteemed in both private and public life, and exceedingly well acquainted with the Stoic system, with whom Marcus shared all his counsels both public and private, whom he greeted with a kiss prior to the prefects of the guard, whom he even appointed consul for a second term, and whom after his death he asked the senate to honour with statues.

In his Meditations, Marcus thanks Rusticus for the Stoic training he received from him:

From Rusticus I received the impression that my character required improvement and discipline; and from him I learned not to be led astray to sophistic emulation, nor to writing on speculative matters, nor to delivering little hortatory orations, nor to showing myself off as a man who practices much discipline, or does benevolent acts in order to make a display.

Marcus also explains how it was from Rusticus that he first came to read the works of Epictetus:

and I am indebted to him for being acquainted with the discourses of Epictetus, which he communicated to me out of his own collection.

== Trial of Justin ==
He was the urban prefect of Rome between 162 and 168, and it was during this time that he conducted the trial of Justin Martyr which led to Justin's execution. Three transcripts of the trial survive, of which the shortest is probably the most accurate.

Justin was denounced to the authorities after disputing with the Cynic philosopher Crescens, according to Tatian and Eusebius. Justin was tried together with six companions. The trial record indicates that Rusticus asked him several questions about Christian beliefs and practices, after which he affirmed the law that failure to sacrifice to the gods in submission to the Imperial decrees was a capital offence. When Justin and his companions refused to do so, Rusticus condemned him and he was beheaded, probably in 165. The martyrdom of Justin preserves the record of the trial.

== See also ==
- Junia (gens)

Political offices
Preceded by Marcus Antonius Hiberus, and Publius Mummius Sisenna as ordinary consul	Suffect consul of the Roman Empire; 133 with Quintus Flavius Tertullus	Succeeded by Tiberius Claudius Atticus Herodes, and Publius Sufenas Verus as suffect consul
Preceded by Julius Geminus Capellianus, and Titus Flavius Boethus as suffect consul	Consul of the Roman Empire; 162 with Lucius Titius Plautius Aquilinus	Succeeded by Tiberius Claudius Paullinus, and Tiberius Claudius Pompeianus as suffect consul
