= Atilia gens =

Ancient Roman family

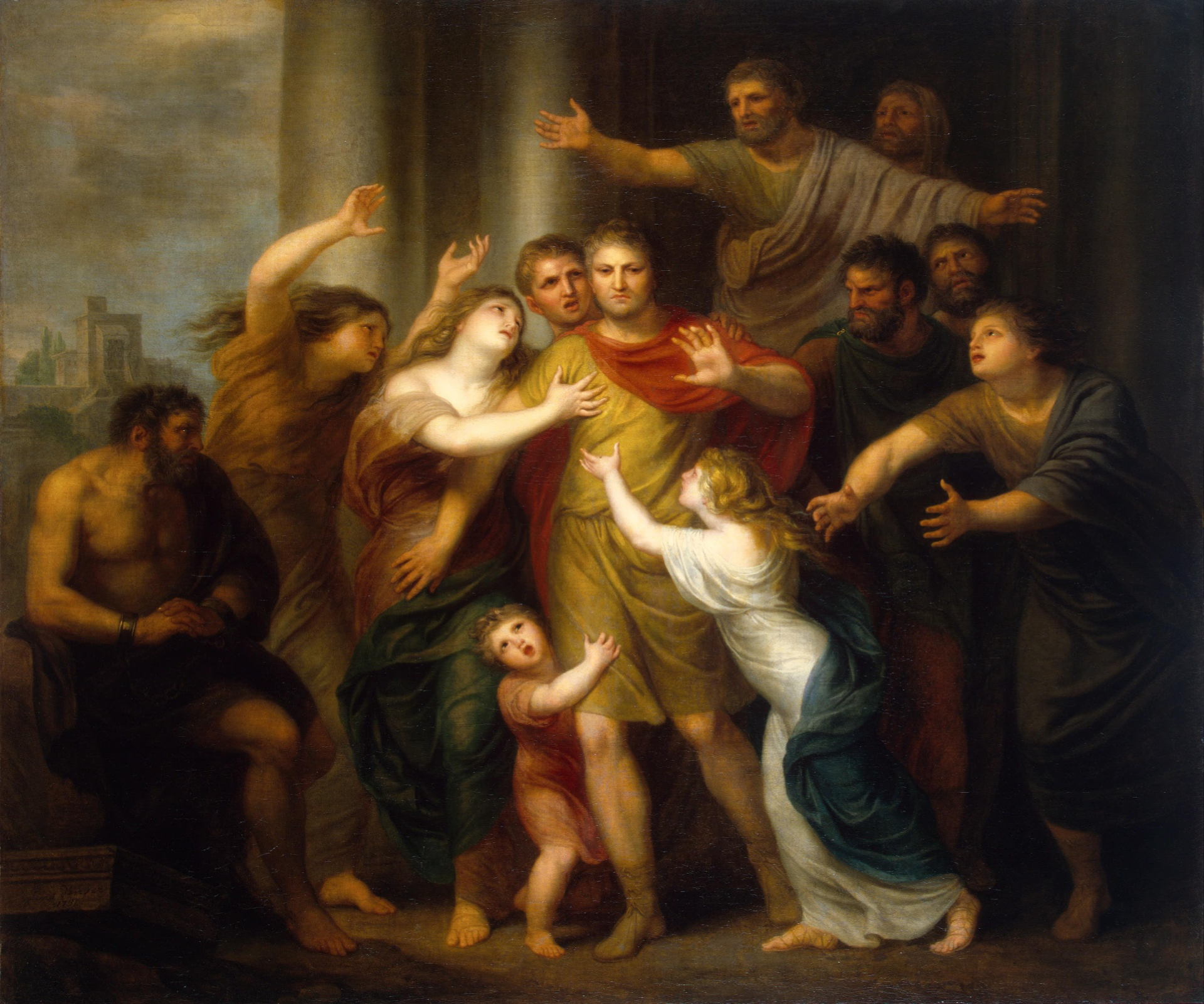
Regulus Returning to Carthage, by Cornelis Lens (1791).

The gens Atilia, sometimes written Atillia, was a plebeian family at ancient Rome, which rose to prominence at the beginning of the fourth century BC. The first member of this gens to attain the consulship was Marcus Atilius Regulus, in 335 BC. The Atilii continued to hold the highest offices of the state throughout the history of the Republic, and well into imperial times.

== Origin ==
Chase classifies the nomen Atilius with a small group of gentilicia probably formed from praenomina ending in -ius using the suffix -ilius, a morphology common in names of Latin origin. The root might then be a praenomen Atius, otherwise unknown, although there was a Sabine praenomen Attius.

== Praenomina ==
The Atilii favored the praenomina Lucius, Marcus, and Gaius, the three most common names throughout Roman history, to which they sometimes added Aulus and Sextus. Under the Empire, some of the Atilii bore the praenomen Titus.

== Branches and cognomina ==
Under the Republic, the cognomina of the Atilii included Bulbus, Calatinus, Luscus, Priscus, Regulus, Nomentanus, and Serranus. Of these, only Regulus and Serranus appear to constitute a distinct family, with the Serrani being descended from the Reguli. The only cognomina found on coins are Saranus, which appears to be the same as Serranus, and Nomentanus.

Luscus, the first surname associated with the Atilii appearing in history, was a common name originally describing someone with poor eyesight, belonging to a large class of cognomina derived from the physical characteristics of individuals. This is the surname as given in Dionysius, although some sources amend it to Longus, originally referring to someone particularly tall. It has been argued that Lucius Atilius Luscus, one of the first consular tribunes elected in 444 BC, was a patrician, since the first plebeians were elected to that office in 400; and most if not all of the ancient patrician gentes possessed plebeian branches, which frequently came to eclipse the fame of their patrician forebears. However, the lists of consular tribunes from both 444 and 422 contain names that are otherwise regarded as plebeian, and according to tradition the office was created with the intention that its members should be elected from either order, so in all probability Luscus, like all of the other Atilii, was plebeian.

Priscus, a personal cognomen belonging to one of the early Atilii, usually translates as "elder", and probably served to distinguish its bearer from younger Atilii of his era.

Bulbus, an onion, belongs to a class of surnames derived from everyday objects, although the circumstances by which such cognomina were acquired by individuals is seldom known. The name is comparable to Caepio, a cognomen with much the same meaning.

The Atilii Reguli were the most illustrious of their gens. The surname Regulus is a diminutive of Rex, a king. This family rose to prominence in the time of the Samnite Wars, and continued down to the interval between the First and Second Punic Wars, at which time it was supplanted by that of Serranus or Saranus. The Atilii Serrani continued down to the time of Cicero, before fading into obscurity.

Calatinus, also found as Caiatinus, the surname of Aulus Atilius Calatinus, a hero of the First Punic War, probably refers either to the town of Cales in Campania, or to the neighboring town of Caia. One of the Atilii Reguli had previously obtained the surname Calenus, in consequence of a battle fought at Cales in 335 BC. Likewise, Nomentanus, the name of one of the Atilii during the late Republic, is derived from the Nomentum, an ancient city of Latium, although his particular connection with that town is unknown.

== Members ==
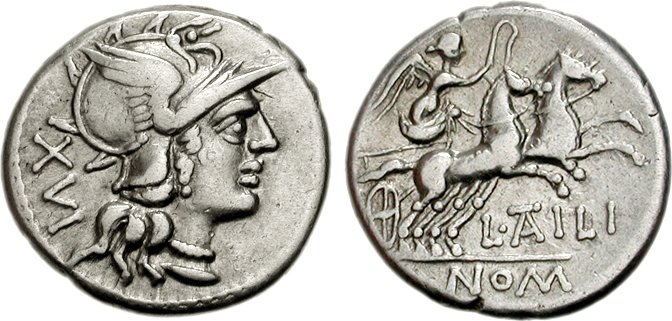
Denarius of Lucius Atilius Nomentanus. On the obverse is a head of Roma, while on the reverse Victoria drives a biga.

This list includes abbreviated praenomina. For an explanation of this practice, see filiation.

- Lucius Atilius Luscus, one of the first consular tribunes, elected in 444 BC. In consequence of a defect in the auspices, he and his colleagues resigned, and consuls were appointed in their stead.
- Lucius Atilius L. f. L. n. Priscus, consular tribune in 399 and 396 BC.
- Lucius Atilius, tribune of the plebs in 311 BC.
- Aulus Atilius A. f. C. n. Calatinus, consul in 258 and 254 BC, and dictator in 249.
- Gaius Atilius A. f. A. n. Bulbus, consul in 245 and 235 BC.
- Lucius Atilius, quaestor in 216 BC, slain at the Battle of Cannae.
- Marcus Atilius, duumvir in 216 BC, with Gaius Atilius, dedicated the temple of Concordia, which Lucius Manlius Vulso, the praetor of 218, had vowed.
- Gaius Atilius, duumvir in 216 BC with Marcus Atilius.
- Lucius Atilius, commander of the Roman garrison in Locri, escaped with his troops by sea, when the town was surrendered to Hannibal in 215 BC.
- Lucius Atilius, praetor in 197 BC, obtained Sardinia as his province.
- Lucius Atilius, sent to Samothrace by Lucius Aemilius Paullus to demand the surrender of Perseus in 168 BC.
- Lucius Atilius, a jurist, who probably lived in the middle of the second century BC
- Marcus Atilius, a comic poet during the second century BC, quoted by Cicero and Varro.
- Lucius Atilius Nomentanus, triumvir monetalis in 141 BC. In 120, he served on the staff of Quintus Mucius Scaevola, praetor in Asia.
- Atilius, a freedman, built an amphitheatre at Fidenae in the reign of Tiberius, which collapsed, killing between twenty and fifty thousand spectators.
- Atilius Vergilio, a standard-bearer who deserted Galba in AD 69.
- Titus Atilius Rufus, a man of consular rank, was governor of Syria, early in the reign of Domitian. He died in AD 84, just before the return of Agricola from Britain.
- Marcus Atilius Postumus Bradua, proconsul of Asia under Domitian.
- Atilius Crescens, a friend of the younger Pliny.
- Marcus Atilius Metilius Bradua, consul in AD 108.
- Marcus Atilius M. f. Metilius Bradua Caucidius Tertullus … Bassus, proconsul of Africa under Antoninus Pius.
- Atilia M. f. Caucidia Tertulla, daughter of the consul Marcus Atilius Metilius Bradua and Caucidia Tertulla.
- Gaius Atilius Serranus, consul suffectus in AD 120.
- Titus Atilius Rufus Titianus, consul in AD 127.
- Titus Atilius Maximus, consul suffectus around AD 130.
- Atilius Fortunatianus, a Latin grammarian, probably not later than the fourth century.

=== Atilii Reguli et Serrani ===
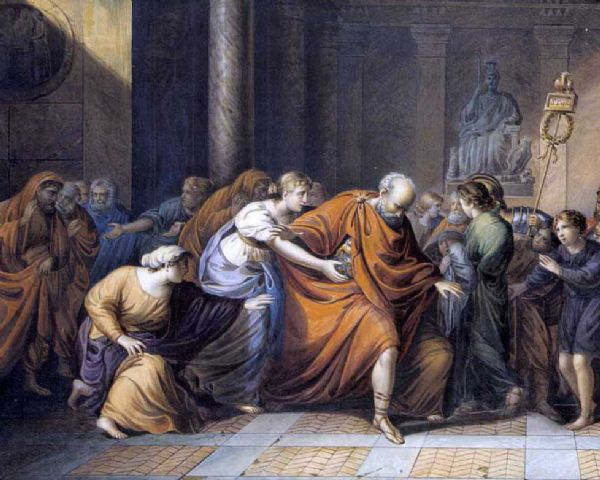
Marcus Atilius Regulus Departs for Carthage, by Michel Ghislain Stapleaux (1832).

- Marcus Atilius (M. f.) Regulus, surnamed Calenus, consul in 335 BC, with his colleague, Marcus Valerius Corvus, conquered Cales.
- Marcus Atilius M. f. M. n. Regulus, consul in 294 BC, triumphed over the Samnites.
- Marcus Atilius M. f. L. n. Regulus, consul in 267 and consul suffectus in 256 BC, captured during the First Punic War.
- Gaius Atilius M. f. M. n. Regulus, surnamed Serranus, consul in 257 and 250 BC.
- Marcus Atilius M. f. M. n. Regulus, consul in 227 and 217 BC, and censor in 214.
- Marcus Atilius (M. f. M. n) Regulus, perhaps praetor in 212 BC, though the position may have instead been held by a Marcus Aemilius Lepidus.
- Gaius Atilius M. f. M. n. Regulus, consul in 225 BC, slain at the Battle of Telamon.
- Gaius Atilius (C. f. M. n.) Serranus, praetor in 218 BC.
- Gaius Atilius (C. f. C. n.) Serranus, praetor in 185 BC.
- Aulus Atilius (C. f. C. n.) Serranus, consul in 170 BC.
- Marcus Atilius (C. f. C. n.) Serranus, praetor in 174 BC, was assigned to Sardinia, and given the command of the war in Corsica.
- Marcus Atilius (M. f. C. n.) Serranus, praetor in Hispania Ulterior in 152 BC, defeated the Lusitani, and took their principal city, Oxthracae.
- Marcus Atilius (M. f. M. n.) Serranus, triumvir monetalis in 151 BC, probably the son of Marcus Atilius Serranus, the praetor of 152. His coins bear the inscription Saran.
- Sextus Atilius M. f. C. n. Serranus, consul in 136 BC.
- Gaius Atilius Serranus, consul in 106 BC, took up arms against Saturninus in 100.
- Atilius Serranus, one of the distinguished men slain by order of Marius and Cinna, when they entered Rome at the close of 87 BC.
- Sextus Atilius Serranus Gavianus, tribune of the plebs in 57 BC.
- Atilius Serranus Domesticus, mentioned by Cicero in 54 BC.
- Atilia, first wife of Cato the Younger

== See also ==
- List of Roman gentes

== Bibliography ==
- Marcus Tullius Cicero, Epistulae ad Quintum Fratrem.
- Dionysius of Halicarnassus, Romaike Archaiologia (Roman Antiquities).
- Titus Livius (Livy), History of Rome.
- Publius Cornelius Tacitus, Annales, De Vita et Moribus Iulii Agricolae (On the Life and Mores of Julius Agricola).
- Gaius Suetonius Tranquillus, De Vita Caesarum (Lives of the Caesars, or The Twelve Caesars).
- Appianus Alexandrinus (Appian), Bellum Civile (The Civil War), Hispanica (The Spanish Wars).
- Joseph Hilarius Eckhel, Doctrina Numorum Veterum (The Study of Ancient Coins, 1792–1798).
- Dictionary of Greek and Roman Biography and Mythology, William Smith, ed., Little, Brown and Company, Boston (1849).
- George Davis Chase, "The Origin of Roman Praenomina", in Harvard Studies in Classical Philology, vol. VIII, pp. 103–184 (1897).
- T. Robert S. Broughton, The Magistrates of the Roman Republic, American Philological Association (1952–1986).
- Michael Crawford, Roman Republican Coinage, Cambridge University Press (1974, 2001).
- Timothy J. Cornell, The Beginnings of Rome: Italy and Rome from the Bronze Age to the Punic Wars (c. 1000–264 BC), Routledge, London (1995).
- John C. Traupman, The New College Latin & English Dictionary, Bantam Books, New York (1995).
- Werner Eck & Peter Weiß, "Hadrianische Konsuln. Neue Zeugnisse aus Militärdiplomen" (Hadrianic Consuls: New Evidence from Military Diplomas), in Chiron, vol. 32 (2002).
- Anthony R. Birley, The Roman Government of Britain, Oxford University Press (2005).
- Sarah B. Pomeroy, The Murder of Regilla: a Case of Domestic Violence in Antiquity, Harvard University Press (2009).
