= Legio XI Claudia =

Roman legion

- Map of the Roman Empire in AD 125, under emperor Hadrian, showing the Legio XI Claudia, stationed on the river Danube at Durostorum (Silistra, Bulgaria), in Moesia Inferior.
- Active: 58 BC to at least 425 AD
- Country: Roman Republic, Roman Empire and Byzantine Empire
- Type: Roman legion
- Role: Heavy Infantry
- Size: Varied: Approximately 4800 men with officers, staff and 120 man cavalry detachment in the 1st Century AD.
- Garrison/HQ: Burnum (9–68 AD); Vindonissa (71–83 AD); Mogontiacum (83–101 AD); Brigetio (101–114 AD); Durostorum (114 – after 395 AD)
- Nicknames: Claudia; Pia VI Fidelis VI
- Mascots: Neptune, she-wolf lactating the twins
- Engagements: Gallic Wars; Battle of the Sabis; Battle of Alesia; Caesar's Civil War; Battle of Dyrrhachium (48 BC); Battle of Pharsalus; Liberators' civil war Battle of Philippi; Final War of the Roman Republic; Battle of Actium; First Battle of Bedriacum; Second Battle of Bedriacum; Revolt of the Batavi; Trajan's Dacian Wars; Bar Kokhba Revolt; Battle of Issus (194); Battle of Ctesiphon (198)

Commanders
- Notable commanders: Julius Caesar; Augustus; Mark Antony; Otho; Vespasian; Trajan; Septimius Severus

Legio XI Claudia ("Claudius' Eleventh Legion") was a legion of the Imperial Roman army. The legion was levied by Julius Caesar for his campaign against the Nervii. XI Claudia dates back to the two legions (the other was the XIIth) recruited by Julius Caesar to invade Gallia in 58 BC, and it existed at least until the early 5th century, guarding lower Danube in Durostorum (modern Silistra, Bulgaria).

== History ==
=== Founding and Service in the Late Republic ===
Legio XI Claudia, along with Legio XII Fulminata, was a Roman Legion levied by Julius Caesar in 58 BC in Cisalpine Gaul, for his war against the Nervii. They likely were present at the Siege of Alesia. After his campaigns in Gaul, civil war broke out between Julius Caesar and Pompey, both of whom were triumvirs, and in January, 49 BC, Caesar invaded Italy with Legio XI serving in his army. They fought in 48 BC at Dyrrhachium and Pharsalus, but were disbanded in 45 BC and settled in Central Italy around the area of Bovianum Undecumanorum.

Legio XI was reconstituted in 42 BC by Octavian for the civil wars. They served under the command of the second triumvirate consisting of Augustus, Mark Antony, and Marcus Aemilius Lepidus against Brutus and Cassius, who had assassinated Julius Caesar. The Legion was present at the Battle of Phillipi in 42 BC, following which they were dispatched to Perugia in Italy to suppress a local revolt. They likely also served with Octavian in Sicily against Sextus Pompeius.

Legio XI participated in the civil war between Augustus and Mark Antony from 32 to 32 BC, and ended with the Battle of Actium. Their participation in the battle was commemorated on the tombstones of soldiers from the Legion.

=== Principate ===
Afterwards, the XI was sent to the Balkans, where it seems to have stayed for a century or so. The location of its base is uncertain prior to 9 AD, when it is recorded at Burnum (Kistanje) involved in construction and development works such as roads. Vexillationes were stationed at Salona and Gardun as well. In 42 AD, Legio XI was still stationed at Burnum when the governor of Dalmatia, Scribonianus, revolted against Claudius. In response, Legio XI put down the rebellion and was awarded the title Claudia Pia Fidelis. Legio XI Claudia remained at Burnum until around 68 AD, at the time of the death of Nero.

During the Year of the Four Emperors, Legio XI Claudia, alongside Legio VII Claudia and Legio XIIII Gemina, sided with Otho, who had executed Galba against Vitellius. They marched to the Battle of Bedriacum but arrived too late, and Vitellius ordered Legio XI Claudia to return to the Balkans without any punishment. Legio XI then sided with Vespasian and participated in the Second Battle of Bedriacum, which resulted in a victory for Vespasian and his accession as emperor.

In 70 AD, Legio XI was part of the expeditionary force under Cerialis to put down the Batavian Revolt on the Rhine. They were then stationed at Vindonissa (Windisch) in 71 AD. There are reports of Legio XI fighting in on the Rhine in 73–74 AD and they participated in Domitian's war against the Chatti in 83 AD. It is believed to have been stationed in Mainz at the time. Later in 101, it was sent to Brigetio (Szony) in Pannonia. They participated in Trajan's Dacian Wars from 101 to 106 AD, commemorated with a column in Rome.

Legio XI Claudia was then sent to Durostorum (Silistra) before 114 AD, when they are first attested at the site, and would remain headquartered there for at least the next three centuries. Soldiers of Legio XI Claudia were dispatched to occupy the Crimea, build the fortress at Drajna in Prahova, and to serve bureaucratic functions in Tomis. A vexillatio was sent to Judea in 132 under Hadrian to suppress the Bar Kokhba revolt; an inscription bearing the legion's name was found near Betar. In 193, Legio XI Claudia supported Septimus Severus and they fought against Pescennius Niger, besieging Byzantium, forcing their way through the Cilician gates, and fighting against his forces at the Battle of Issus. They also took part in Severus' Parthian campaign, in which they helped capture Ctesiphon in 198.

=== Crisis of the Third Century and Dominate ===
In 260–268 the Legion supported Gallienus in his war against Postumus of the Gallic Empire, being awarded the title Pia Fidelis for the 5th and 6th times, although unlike other units it never received a 7th recognition. In 273 the Legion participated in road construction in modern Jordan, and in 295 a detachment was present in Egypt. In 298 a detachment of XI Claudia was stationed in Mauretania.Two Christians within the legion named Julius and Hesychius were persecuted by Diocletian in 302, at Durostorum. Aurelius Sudecentius, a soldier of Legio XI Claudia's western detachment, died in Mauretania and was commemorated by a tombstone in Aquileia dating to the 4th century AD. In 395–425, the Legion remained headquartered on the Danube at Durostorum, with field army detachments under the Magister Militum per Gallias and under the Magister Militum Praesentalis II.

== Known members of the legion ==
Name	Rank	Time frame	Province	Source
Lucius Vorenus	centurio	54 BC	?	Commentarii de Bello Gallico, 5.44 N.B. Caesar does not state here or anywhere else the name of the legion concerned in this incident involving Vorenus and Pullo (see next entry). He refers only to Vorenus and Pullo serving 'in that legion' (in ea legione), and that it was commanded by Quintus Cicero. Their attribution to Legio XI Claudia is therefore not grounded in the available evidence.
Titus Pullo	centurio	54 BC	Italy	Commentarii de Bello Gallico, 5.44
Titus Flavius Rufus	centurio (veteranus)	?	Italia, Moesia, Dacia	CIL XI, 20 = ILS 2082, CIL III, 00971
Quintus Sertorius Festus	centurio	2nd half of 1st century AD		CIL V, 03374
Lucius Annius Bassus	legatus	AD 69		Tacitus, Histories III.50
Lucius Julius Marinus Caecilius Simplex	legatus	between 91 and 95		CIL IX, 4965 = ILS 1026
Gaius Julius Quadratus Bassus	legatus	99-101		
Publius Metilius Secundus	legatus	c. 116		CIL XI, 3718
Gaius Oppius Sabinus Julius Nepos Manius Vibius Sollemnis Severus	legatus	between 120 and 130		CIL IX, 5833 = ILS 1047
Quintus Caecilius Marcellus Dentilianus	legatus	c. 142-c. 145		CIL VIII, 14291 = ILS 1096
Tiberius Claudius Julianus	legatus	c. 145-148		CIL III, 7474
Marcus Claudius Fronto	legatus	c. 158-c. 161		CIL III, 1457
Cornelius Plotianus	legatus	c. 161-c. 164		AE 1925, 109
Tiberius Claudius Saethida Caelianus	legatus	c. 170		CIL X, 1123
Tiberius Claudius Gordianus	legatus	around 185/186		AE 1954, 138
Marcus Annaeus Saturninus Clodianus Aelianus	legatus	end 2nd century/beginning of 3rd century		CIL VI, 1337
Decimus Terentius Gentianus	military tribune	before 106		TLMN4, 4
Gaius Eggius Ambibulus	military tribune	between 100 and 115		CIL IX, 1123
Lucius Minicius Natalis Quadronius Verus	military tribune	c. 115		CIL II, 4510
Quintus Caecilius Marcellus Dentilianus	military tribune	before 130		CIL VIII, 14291 = ILS 1096; CIL VIII, 14292
Marcus Magnus Valerianus	military tribune	c. 170		CIL XI, 2106
Lucius Junius Aurelius Neratio Gallus Fulvius Macer	military tribune	between 171 and 230		CIL VI, 1433
Marcus Aelius Aurelius Theo	military tribune	first half 3rd century		CIL XI, 376 = ILS 1192
Cicereius Ascanius	primus pilus	mid first century		CIL III, 14996
Cicereius Laevus	primus pilus	mid first century		CIL III, 14996
Marcus Aquillius M. f. Felix	primus pilus	AD 193	?	
Lucius Sertorius Firmus	aquilifer	2nd half of 1st century AD		CIL V, 3375
Lucius Cicereius	legionarius	mid first century		CIL III, 14996

== See also ==
- Capidava
- List of Roman legions
