= Marcus Antonius Hiberus =

2nd century Roman senator, consul and governor

Marcus Antonius Hiberus was a Roman senator, who was active during the reign of Hadrian. He was consul ordinarius for the year 133 with Publius Mummius Sisenna as his colleague. He is known entirely from inscriptions.

Besides his consulship, only one office has been attested for Hiberus: his governorship of the imperial province of Moesia Inferior, which is attested by a bilingual inscription recording a letter of Septimius Severus that mentions him as a governor of that province. The precise date he governed Moesia Inferior is unclear. Werner Eck dates it to the last years of Hadrian or first years of Antoninus Pius. Géza Alföldy argues that he was appointed governor around 136, in the last years of Hadrian's reign, and continued into Antoninus Pius' reign to around 139, based on a restoration of a military diploma dated 28 February 138. Meanwhile, Margaret Roxan and Paul Holder, in publishing a second military diploma, favor the first years of Antoninus Pius' reign, namely from around 138 to about 141. This matter is complicated by the fact that one Julius Crassus is also attested as governor of Moesia Inferior around this same time.

Political offices
| Preceded by Gaius Acilius Priscus, and Aulus Cassius Arrianus as suffect consuls | Consul of the Roman Empire; 133 with Publius Mummius Sisenna | Succeeded by Quintus Flavius Tertullus, and Quintus Junius Rusticus as suffect consuls |
