= Gaius Calpurnius Flaccus =

Gaius Calpurnius Flaccus was a Roman senator of the second century. He was attested suffect consul with Lucius Trebius Germanus as his colleague on 15 December of an undetermined year between 122 and 127. Both Flaccus and Germanus are primarily known from inscriptions.

Géza Alföldy has suggested that Flaccus might be the son of a Calpurnius Flaccus, to whom Pliny the Younger wrote a short and chatty letter. Alföldy identified the son with another Gaius Calpurnius Flaccus, known from an inscription, who was flamen provinciae Hispaniae about the time of Hadrian's visit to Tarraco.

The cursus honorum of Flaccus is imperfectly known from an inscription from Salamis. His first known office was as legatus legionis or commander of a Roman legion in the Rhine provinces with "Augustus" in its name; Alföldy argues that Flaccus was legatus more likely of Legio II Augusta than Legio VIII Augusta, since no legates of the second unit are known to have gone on to govern provinces after the Flavian dynasty. Next Flaccus was governor of a province whose name begins with the letters "Lu" -- either Lusitania or Gallia Lugdunensis -- from the year 119 to 121. This was followed a few years later as governor of Cyprus in 122/123, after which he acceded to the consulate.

Flaccus' life is unrecorded after his consulate.
