= Lucius Aemilius Juncus =

Lucius Aemilius Juncus was a senator of the Roman Empire, and a philosopher. He was consul suffect in the last three months of 127 with Sextus Julius Severus as his colleague.

== Life ==
According to John Oliver, Juncus came of an equestrian background. There is a lead tessera found in Beirut attesting to a procurator of Syria named L. Aemilius Juncus (AE 1903, 116), who has been identified with this suffect consul or the suffect consul of 179 who was exiled in 183. In either case, Juncus is likely not related to the patrician Aemilia gens, although he may be descended from a client or freedman of a member of that family.

Oliver infers that Juncus married Varia Archelais, the daughter of Tiberius Varius Caelianus, the diadochos of a philosophical school at Athens between 107 and 120, prior to his consulship, because "a consular would have presumably contracted a more splendid marriage than that with the daughter of a philosopher." Oliver wonders whether Juncus had met Varia while visiting Athens with the Emperor Hadrian in 125.

A letter of Hadrian's to Coronea in 135 shows that he appointed Aemilius Juncus as special commissioner for Achaea, to look into construction works in Boeotia that had been facing ten years of delays. An inscription attests that, along with the emperor Hadrian, he recommended Tiberius Claudius Hermoneikos son of Pleistoxenos to receive the title of aristopoleiteutes from the city of Sparta.

By Varia, Juncus had at least one son, also named Lucius Aemilius Juncus, suffect consul in 154 and proconsul of Asia in 171/172. Juncus the Elder was still alive when his son was appointed consul. There is evidence Varia and Juncus had two more children.

== Writings ==
Oliver makes a persuasive argument that Juncus the older is the author of a philosophical tract Περὶ Γἡρῳς ("On Old Age"), from which an extended extract was preserved in Stobaeus.

Political offices
Preceded by Quintus Tineius Rufus, and Marcus Licinius Celer Nepos as suffect consuls	Suffect consul of the Roman Empire; AD 127 with Sextus Julius Severus	Succeeded by Lucius Nonius Calpurnius Torquatus Asprenas II, and Marcus Annius Libo as ordinary consuls
