= Gavius Bassus =

Gavius Bassus, also spelled as Gabius Bassus, was a 1st-century BCE author, philologist, and Latin grammarian from Ancient Rome. His literary work is considered to be lost. Bassus is the author of Commentarii (Commentaries), works on etymology, titled De Origine Verborum et Vocabulorum (On the Origin of Words and Vocabularies), and religious works, titled De dis (About the Gods). His works were quoted by other scholars, including Quintilian, Aulus Gellius, and Macrobius.

== See also ==
- Gavia gens
