= Legio XIV Gemina =

Roman legion

Legio XIV Gemina Martia Victrix
- Map of the Roman Empire in AD 125, under emperor Hadrian, showing the LEGIO XIV G M V, stationed on the river Danube at Carnuntum (Petronell, Austria), in Pannonia Superior province, from AD 106 until the 5th century
- Active: 41 BC to early 5th century at least
- Country: Roman Republic (1st & 2nd raising under Caesar, 2nd Triumvirate); Roman Empire (3rd raising was a joining with another understrength legion under Octavian after the Battle of Actium)
- Type: Roman legion (Marian) (with Imperial modifications) later a comitatensis unit
- Role: Heavy Infantry (occasionally cavalry support when operating independently)
- Size: Varied over unit lifetime. Approx. 3,500 fighting men + support at the time of creation, ~ 5,000 to 6,000 men when operating independently during Imperial period.
- Garrison/HQ: Moguntiacum (9–43); Vindobona (92–106); Carnuntum (106–5th century)
- Nicknames: Gemina Martia Victrix, "Twinned Mars’ Victory"; Martia Victrix, "Mars’ Victory" (added by Augustus); Pia VI Fidelis VI, "six times faithful, six times loyal" (added by Gallienus)
- Mascot: Capricorn
- Engagements: Gallic Wars (58–51 BC); Caesar's Civil War (49–45 BC); Post-Caesarian civil war (44 BC); Liberators' civil war (44–42 BC); Sicilian revolt (44–36 BC); Perusine War (41–40 BC); Final War of the Roman Republic (32–30 BC); Roman conquest of Britain (43); Year of the Four Emperors (69); Revolt of the Batavi (69-70) revolt of Saturninus (89); Dacian Wars (101–106); Verus Parthian campaign (161–166); Marcus Aurelius Marcomannic campaign (168–180); Septimius Severus rise to power (193–194); Severus Parthian campaign (198) vexillationes of the 14th participated in many other campaigns.

Legio XIV Gemina ("The Twinned Fourteenth Legion") was a legion of the Imperial Roman army, levied by Julius Caesar in 57 BC. The cognomen Gemina (Twinned) was added when the legion was combined with another understrengthed legion after the Battle of Actium. The cognomen Martia Victrix (martial and victorious) was added following their service in the Pannonian War c. AD 9 and the defeat of Boudicca in AD 61. The emblem of the legion was the Capricorn, as with many of the legions levied by Caesar.

== History ==
=== Under Caesar ===
Legio XIV was first raised by Caesar in Cisalpine Gaul during his raids into, and conquest of, Gaul. Their enlistment term was for 16 years, as per the other Republican legions (though Augustus raised that to 20). In the first years, the legion frequently was left behind to guard the camp during battles and raids. Following its early destruction at Atuatuca (near today's Tongeren, Belgium) by the Eburones during Ambiorix's revolt it was immediately reconstituted. For years after the Massacre at Atuatuca they were viewed as an unlucky legion, but its honor had been restored due to the efforts of their Aquilifer, Lucius Petrosidius.

=== Under Germanicus ===
This legion fought under General Germanicus Julius Caesar against the Germanic leader Arminius. A decade before this campaign, Arminius succeeded in wiping out three entire legions in the Battle of the Teutoburg Forest, one of the greatest disasters in Roman military history. The legion secured a victory for Germanicus, and earned him a triumph from his adopted father and biological uncle, Emperor Tiberius.

=== Invasion of Britain ===
Stationed in Moguntiacum, Germania Superior from AD 9, Legio XIV Gemina Martia Victrix was one of four legions used by Aulus Plautius and Claudius in the Roman invasion of Britain in AD 43. It built its legionary fortress at Mancetter on Watling Street and by AD 58 it had moved its base to Wroxeter.

It took part in the defeat of Boudicca in 60 or 61. At the Battle of Watling Street the 14th defeated Boudicca's force of 230,000, according to Tacitus and Dio, with their meager force of 10,000 Legionaries and Auxiliaries. This act secured them as Nero's "most effective" legion, and he kept them garrisoned in Britain during the next few years to keep the uneasy tribes in check.

In 67 AD the legion was sent to the Balkans in preparation for a campaign against the Parthians that Nero planned but which never materialised.

=== In support of Septimius Severus ===
On 9 April AD 193, following the death of Pertinax, Legio XIV Gemina acclaimed the governor of Pannonia Superior Septimius Severus emperor, along with the other legions along the Danube frontier. The Fourteenth afterwards marched to Rome and deposed Didius Julianus (193). Afterwards the legion contributed to the defeat of the usurper Pescennius Niger (194), and probably fought in the Parthian campaign that ended with the sack of the capital of the empire, Ctesiphon (198).

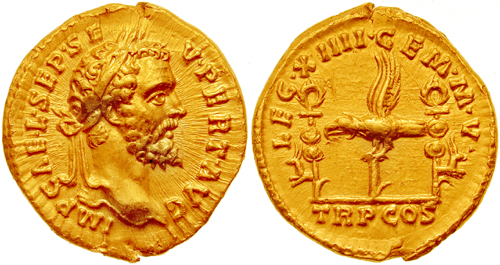
Aureus minted in 193 by Septimius Severus, to celebrate XIIII Gemina Martia Victrix, the legion that proclaimed him emperor

=== In support of imperial candidates ===
In the turmoil following the defeat of Valerian, the XIV Gemina supported usurper Regalianus against Emperor Gallienus (260), then Gallienus against Postumus of the Gallic Empire (earning the title VI Pia VI Fidelis—"six times faithful, six times loyal"), and, after Gallienus' death, Gallic Emperor Victorinus (269–271).

Shield design of the Quartodecimani, a comitatensis legion under the Magister Militum per Thracias, 5th century, according to Notitia Dignitatum.

== Attested members ==
Name	Rank	Time frame	Province	Source
Titus Flavius Rufus	centurio (veteranus)	?	Italia, Moesia, Dacia	CIL XI, 20, CIL III, 00971
Fabius Priscus	legatus	c. 70	Britannica	Tacitus, Histories IV.79.3
Sextus Julius Severus	legatus	between 110 and 119	Pannonia	CIL III, 2830
Publius Cluvius Maximus Paullinus	legatus	c. 138-c. 141	Pannonia	AE 1940, 99
Marcus Nonius Macrinus	legatus	c. 147-c. 150	Pannonia	AE 1907, 180
Marcus Statius Priscus	legatus	c. 153-c. 156	Pannonia	CIL VI, 1523
Gaius Vettius Sabinianus	legatus	c. 170/171	Pannonia	AE 1920, 45
Lucius Ragonius Quintianus	legatus	c. 177-c. 180	Pannonia	CIL V, 1968
Titus Flavius Secundus Philippianus	legatus	c. 193/194	Pannonia	
Gnaeus Petronius Probatus Junius Justus	legatus	between 222 and 235	Pannonia	CIL X, 1254
Marcus Cornelius Nigrinus Curiatius Maternus	tribunus angusticlavius	60s	Britannica	CIL II, 3788
Lucius Cornelius Pusio Annius Messalla	tribunus laticlavius	c. 59	Britannica	CIL VI, 37056
Titus Flaminius	miles	c. 55-69	Britannica	RIB 292
Marcus Petronius	miles	c. 55-69	Britannica	RIB 294
Sextus Julius Severus	tribunus laticlavius	between 105 and 110	Pannonia	CIL III, 2830
Lucius Minicius Natalis Quadronius Verus	tribunus laticlavius	c. 116	Pannonia	CIL XIV, 3599, CIL II, 4510

== See also ==
- List of Roman legions

== Bibliography ==
- Mommsen, Theodor The History of Rome, Volume 1.
- Pollard, Nigel & Berry, Joanne The Complete Roman Legions.
- Parker, H. M. D. The Roman Legions.
- Ireland, Stanley Roman Britain: A Sourcebook (Routledge Sourcebooks for the Ancient World), 3rd Edition.
