= Sextus Julius Severus =

2nd-century Roman general, consul and governor

Gnaeus Minicius Faustinus Sextus Julius Severus
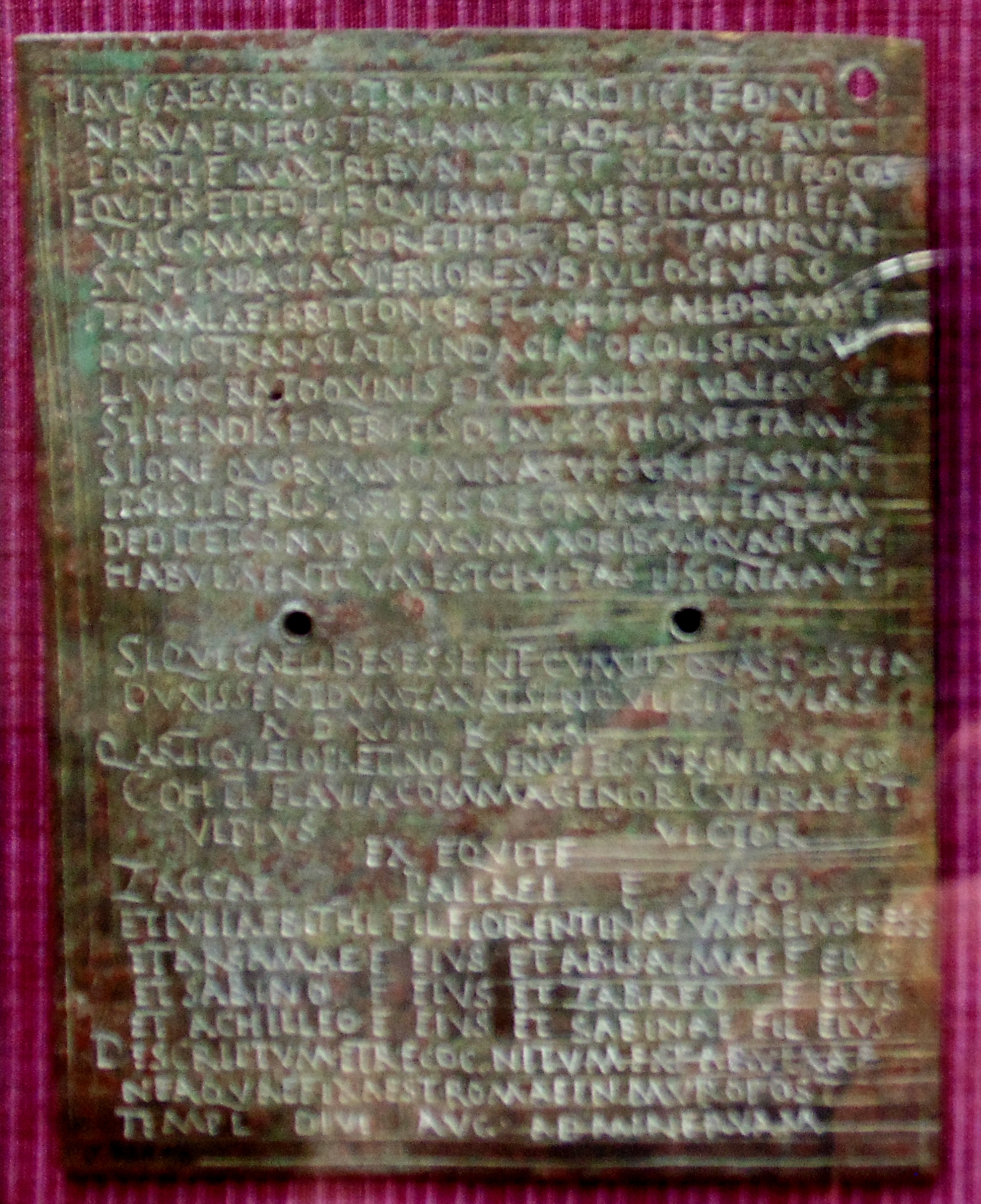
- Detail of military diploma RMM 22, in which he appears as "consul ordinarius".

Suffect Consul of the Roman Empire
- In office c. 127 AD – c. 127 AD
- Preceded by: Quintus Tineius Rufus; M. Licinius Celer Nepos
- Succeeded by: Lucius Nonius Calpurnius Torquatus Asprenas; Marcus Annius Libo

Governor of Roman Britain
- In office c. 131 AD – c. 133 AD
- Preceded by: Lucius Trebius Germanus
- Succeeded by: Publius Mummius Sisenna

Gnaeus Minicius Faustinus Sextus Julius Severus (born Sextus Julius Severus) was a Roman administrator who served as suffect consul in c. 127 AD and governed the provinces of Roman Dacia, Roman Britain, and Judaea. He suppressed the Bar Kokhba Revolt.

== Sources ==
One of the most details records of Severus' life comes from a statue-base at Burnum in Dalmatia. Cassius Dio wrote about how Severus commanded the Roman military during the Bar Kokhba Revolt.

== Early life ==
Severus was born in Aequum.

== Career ==
Severus served as suffect consul in 127 AD. He was either adopted by Gnaeus Minicius Faustinus, suffect consul in 117 AD, or someone with a similar name after his time as suffect consul; after this adoption he started to style his name as Gnaeus Minicius Faustinus Julius.

Severus commanded the Legio XIV Gemina. Severus served as the praetorian legate of Roman Dacia under Hadrian c. 120 to 126 AD. Severus had fifteen years of service in the Roman military when he was selected as governor of Roman Britain.

Hadrian sent Severus to Judaea to suppress the Bar Kokhba Revolt. He replaced Quintus Tineius Rufus, the military legate of the province and was later made legate of Roman Syria as well. Dio wrote that Severus avoided pitched battles with the rebels and instead fought a war of attrition that destroyed Judaea and killed a large amount of the population. The Roman Senate granted Severus a triumph for suppressing the revolt. Dio incorrectly wrote that Severus was made legate of Bithynia and Pontus after the revolt, having confused him with G. J. Severus.

== Works cited ==
=== Books ===
- Cascio, Elio; Tacoma, Laurens, eds. (2017). The Impact of Mobility and Migration in the Roman Empire: Proceedings of the Twelfth Workshop of the International Network Impact of Empire (Rome, June 17-19, 2015). Brill Publishers. ISBN 9789004334779.

=== Journals ===
- Katzoff, Ranon (1993). "Roman Edicts and Tacanit 29A". Classical Philology. 88 (2). University of Chicago Press: 141–144. doi:10.2307/269894. JSTOR 269894.
- Syme, Ronald (1965). "Governors of Pannonia Inferior". Historia: Zeitschrift für Alte Geschichte. 14 (3). Franz Steiner Verlag: 342–361. doi:10.2307/4434890. JSTOR 4434890.

=== Web ===
- Krauss, Samuel; Gottheil, Richard. "Severus, Julius". The Jewish Encyclopedia. Archived from the original on 7 November 2026.

Political offices
Preceded by Quintus Tineius Rufus; Marcus Licinius Celer Nepos as suffect consuls	Roman consul 127 (suffect) with Lucius Aemilius Juncus	Succeeded by Lucius Nonius Calpurnius Torquatus Asprenas II; Marcus Annius Libo as ordinary consuls
Preceded by possibly Trebius Germanus	Governor of Britain c. 131	Succeeded by Publius Mummius Sisenna
