= Publius Mummius Sisenna =

2nd century senator, consul and governor

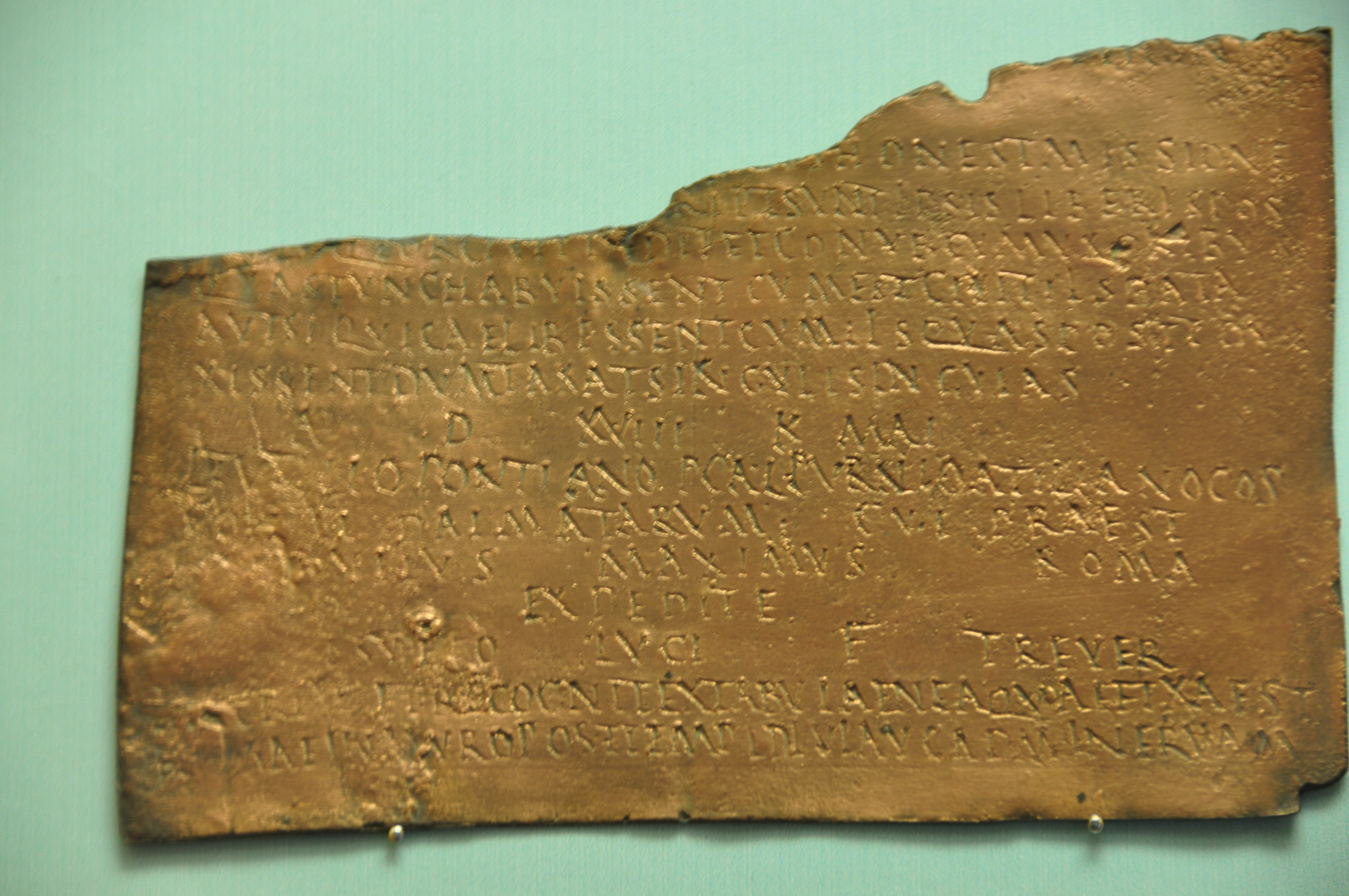
- Military diploma CIL XVI, 82, dated 14 April 135 AD, attesting him as governor

Suffect Consul of the Roman Empire
- In office c. 133 AD – c. 133 AD
- Preceded by: Sextus Julius Severus; Lucius Aemilius Juncus
- Succeeded by: Q. Flavius Tertullus; Junius Rusticus

Governor of Roman Britain
- In office c. 133 AD – c. 135 AD
- Preceded by: Sextus Julius Severus
- Succeeded by: Quintus Lollius Urbicus

Personal details
- Born: c. 1st century AD Hispania Baetica, Roman Empire
- Died: c. 2nd century AD
- Occupation: Ancient Roman politician

Publius Mummius Sisenna was a Roman politician who was consul ordinarius in 133 with Marcus Antonius Hiberus as his colleague, and governor of Roman Britain shortly afterwards.

Ronald Syme considers Sisenna's tribe "Galeria" as clear evidence that his family origins lay in Spain, and counts twenty different individuals from those provinces who shared his gentilicium.

== Life ==
Little is known of his career. Syme speculates that Sisenna may be identical with a "Publius" known to have been governor of Thracia between the years 128 and 136. Sisenna is attested as governor of Roman Britain in a fragmentary inscription at Wroxeter dated 14 April 135. The brief period between his consulship and governorship is unusual; he was one of only three persons known to have proceeded directly to governorship of Roman Britain without governing another province first. The sudden departure of Sextus Julius Severus to Judaea to suppress a rebellion there would explain part of this. Birley speculates that no other person was suitable for the job, and Hadrian appointed him to the ordinary consulship as a means to render Sisenna eligible more rapidly.

Another inscription was thought to show Sisenna to be proconsul of Asia in 150–51, but is now regarded as pertaining to his probable son.

Based on the unusual name, he was kinsman to, if not father of, the suffect consul of 146 and proconsul of Asia, Publius Mummius Sisenna Rutilianus. Rutilianus served as legate of Legio VI Victrix, which was stationed in Britain, likely during the tenure of Sisenna. If they were father and son, that Rutilianus became consul only thirteen years after Sisenna suggests that the older man attained the fasces late in life.

Political offices
Preceded by Gaius Acilius Priscus, and Aulus Cassius Arrianus as suffect consuls	Consul of the Roman Empire; 133 with Marcus Antonius Hiberus	Succeeded by Quintus Flavius Tertullus, and Quintus Junius Rusticus as suffect consuls
Preceded by Sextus Julius Severus	Governor of Roman Britain c. 135	Unknown Title next held by Quintus Lollius Urbicus
