= Lucius Dasumius Tullius Tuscus =

2nd century Roman senator, consul and imperial advisor

Lucius Dasumius Tullius Tuscus was a Roman senator who was an amici or trusted advisor of the emperors Antoninus Pius and Marcus Aurelius. He was suffect consul in the nundinium of April to June 152 AD as the colleague of Publius Sufenas.

He is also known as Lucius Dasumius Tuscus and Lucius Tullius Tuscus.

== Family ==
Olli Salomies has argued, based on the commonalities in the names, membership in the same tribe, Stellatina, and that inscriptions honoring both were dedicated by the same man, P. Tullius Callistio, that Publius Tullius Varro, consul in 127, was Tuscus' birth father. The "Lucius Dasumius" in his name refers to his adoptive father, whom Salomies believes was "certainly related" to Publius Dasumius Rusticus, eponymous consul of 119. The origins of he and his father are considered to be the Etruscan town of Tarquinia, which was assigned to the Stellatina tribe.

Tuscus is considered to be the father of Marcus Dasumius Tullius Varro; the name of his wife, and any other possible children, are unrecorded.

== Career ==
The career of Tuscus is known through an inscription found in Tarquinia. As a teenager, he was a member of the tresviri monetalis, considered by modern scholars the most favored of the magistracies that comprised the vigintiviri. It was usually held either by Patricians or young men favored by the Emperor. Plebeians who held this office usually went on to enjoy successful careers. Evidence of this favor appears shortly afterwards: after serving a term as military tribune in Legio IV Flavia Felix based at Singidunum, Tuscus served as quaestor to the emperor Antoninus Pius, then was legatus or assistant to the proconsul of Africa. These latter two assignments provided him with potential for visibility and introductions to influential people.

After holding the Republican magistracies of plebeian tribune and praetor, Tuscus was prefect of the aerarium Saturni (c. 147-c. 150). While suffect consul he was governor of Germania Superior (c. 152-c. 158) and his term as curator operum publicorum possibly was also simultaneous. His last known office was governor of Pannonia Superior during the reigns of Marcus Aurelius and Lucius Verus, as the successor of Marcus Nonius Macrinus and predecessor of Marcus Iallius Bassus.

The inscription from Tarquinia also attests that he was a member of the sodales Hadrianales and sodali Antoniniani (the latter most likely after the emperor's death), as well as holding the prestigious sacral office of augur.

Political offices
Preceded by Manius Acilius Glabrio Gnaeus Cornelius Severus, and Marcus Valerius Homullus as ordinary consuls	Suffect consul of the Roman Empire; 152 with Publius Sufenas	Succeeded by Gaius Novius Priscus, and Lucius Julius Romulus as suffect consuls
