= Titus Flavius Rufus =

Roman soldier

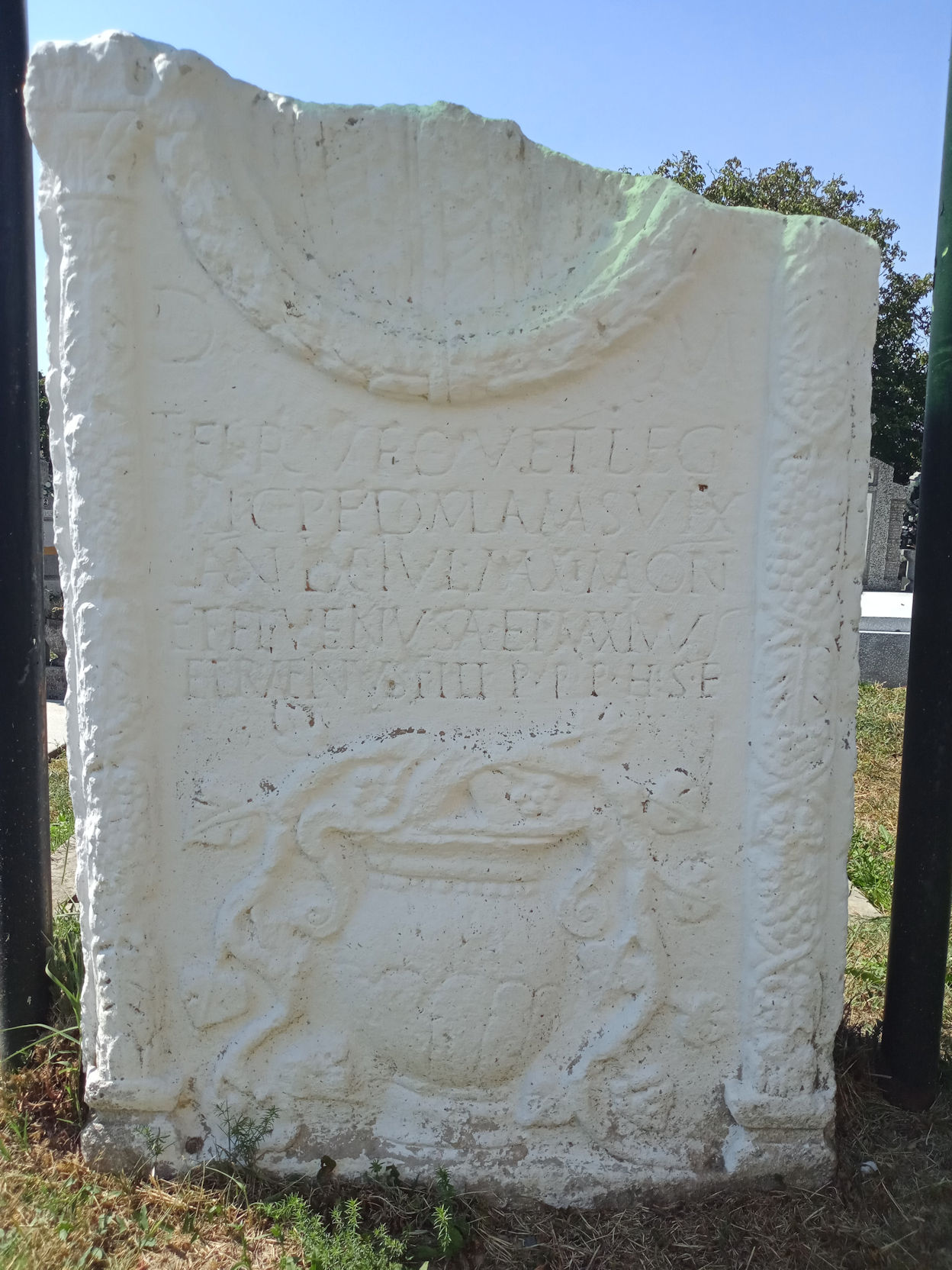
- His tombstone from Răhău
- Died: modern Răhău, Alba County, Romania
- Military career
- Rank: Centurion
- Unit: Legio XI Claudia

Titus Flavius Rufus, son of Titus, of the (voting) tribe Pupinia, was a Roman Centurion in several legions. During his military career, he was promoted from miles in urban cohorts in Rome (Urban cohors XII) to centurio in four different legions: Legio XIV Gemina, Legio XI Claudia, Legio II Augusta and Legio VII Gemina. Additionally, he was ordinatus architectus, tesserarius of a centuria in the 4th Praetorian Cohort, beneficiarius to the Praetorian Praefect, cornicularius to the Praefectus Annonae.

After demobilization, he settled as veteranus in a rural area, in a villa rustica, located at approximately 16 miles (~25 km) from Apulum, an important city of the province Dacia. He lived there with his family until the age of 60 years when he died. His wife, Iulia Maxima, together with the children Flavia Venusta, Maximus and Rufinus, erected his tombstone which was found in the cemetery of modern Răhău village (Sebeș), Alba County, Romania.

His tombstone contains engraved the following text:

D(iis) M(anibus)
T(ito) Fl(avio) Rufo vet(erano) leg(ionis)
XI C(laudiae) p(iae) f(idelis) dom(o) Amas(ia) vix(it)
an(nos) LX Iul(ia) Maxima con(iux)
et Fl(avia) Venusta et Maximus
et Rufinus fili(i) p(ro) p(ietate) p(osuerunt) h(ic) s(itus) e(st)

The English translation of this text is:

To the Spirits of deceased,
Titus Flavius Rufus, veteran of the legion XI Claudia Pia Fidelis (honorary title offered by Roman Emperors to faithful Legions),
born in Amasia, lived 60 years. Wife Iulia Maxima
and children Flavia Venusta and Maximus
and Rufinus - they put this site for devotion.

The tombstone of his wife, Iulia Maxima, was found too, nearby.

Another tombstone exists in Ravenna, Italy, erected by his sister Ulpia and Aelia Secundina. This tombstone contains engraved the following text:

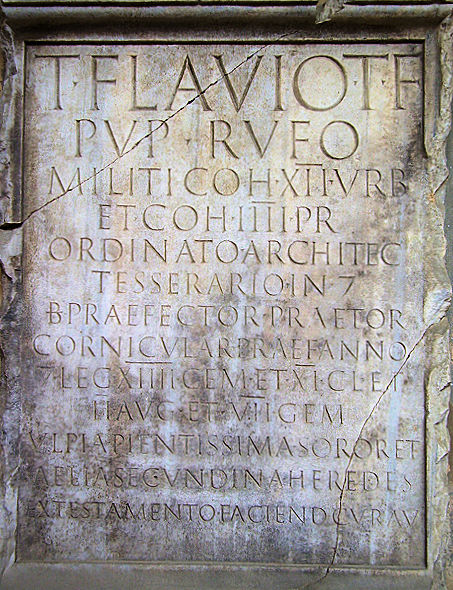
Tombstone from Ravenna

T(ito) Flavio T(iti) f(ilio)
Pup(inia) Rufo
militi coh(ortis) XII urb(anae)
et coh(ortis) IIII pr(aetoriae)
ordinato architec(to)
tesserario in (centuria)
b(eneficiario) praefector(um) praetor(io)
cornicular(io) praef(ecti) anno(nae)
(centurioni) leg(ionis) XIIII Gem(inae) et XI Cl(audiae) et
II Aug(ustae) et VII Gem(inae)
Ulpia pientissima soror et
Aelia Secundina heredes
ex testamento faciend(um) curav(erunt)

The English translation of this text is:

To Titus Flavius Rufus, son of Titus, of the (voting) tribe Pupinia, soldier of the 12th Urban cohort and ordinatus architectus and tesserarius of a centuria in the 4th Praetorian cohort, beneficiarius to the Praetorian Praefects, cornicularius to the Praefectus Annonae, centurio of Legions XIV Gemina, XI Claudia, II Augusta and VII Gemina. Ulpia, his very pious sister and Aelia Secundina, his heirs had this tombstone set up according to his will.
