= Calpurnius Flaccus =

2nd century Roman rhetorician

Calpurnius Flaccus was a rhetorician who lived in the reign of Hadrian, and whose fifty-one declamations frequently accompany those of Quintilian. They were first published by Pierre Pithou in Paris in 1580. Pliny the Younger writes to Flaccus, who, in some editions, is called Calpurnius Flaccus.

== See also ==
- Gaius Calpurnius Flaccus

== Editions ==
- Hakanson, Lennart (1978). Calpurnii Flacci declamationum excerpta. Bibliotheca Teubneriana. Stuttgart: Teubner, ISBN 3-519-01130-1
- Sussman, L. A. (1994). The Declamations of Calpurnius Flaccus: Text, Translation, and Commentary. Leiden: Brill, ISBN 90-04-09983-2
- Knoch, Stefan (2024). Calpurnius Flaccus, Deklamationen. Sammlung Tusculum. Berlin/Boston: De Gruyter, ISBN 978-3-11-115430-5
