= Titus Atilius Rufus =

1st century Roman senator and governor

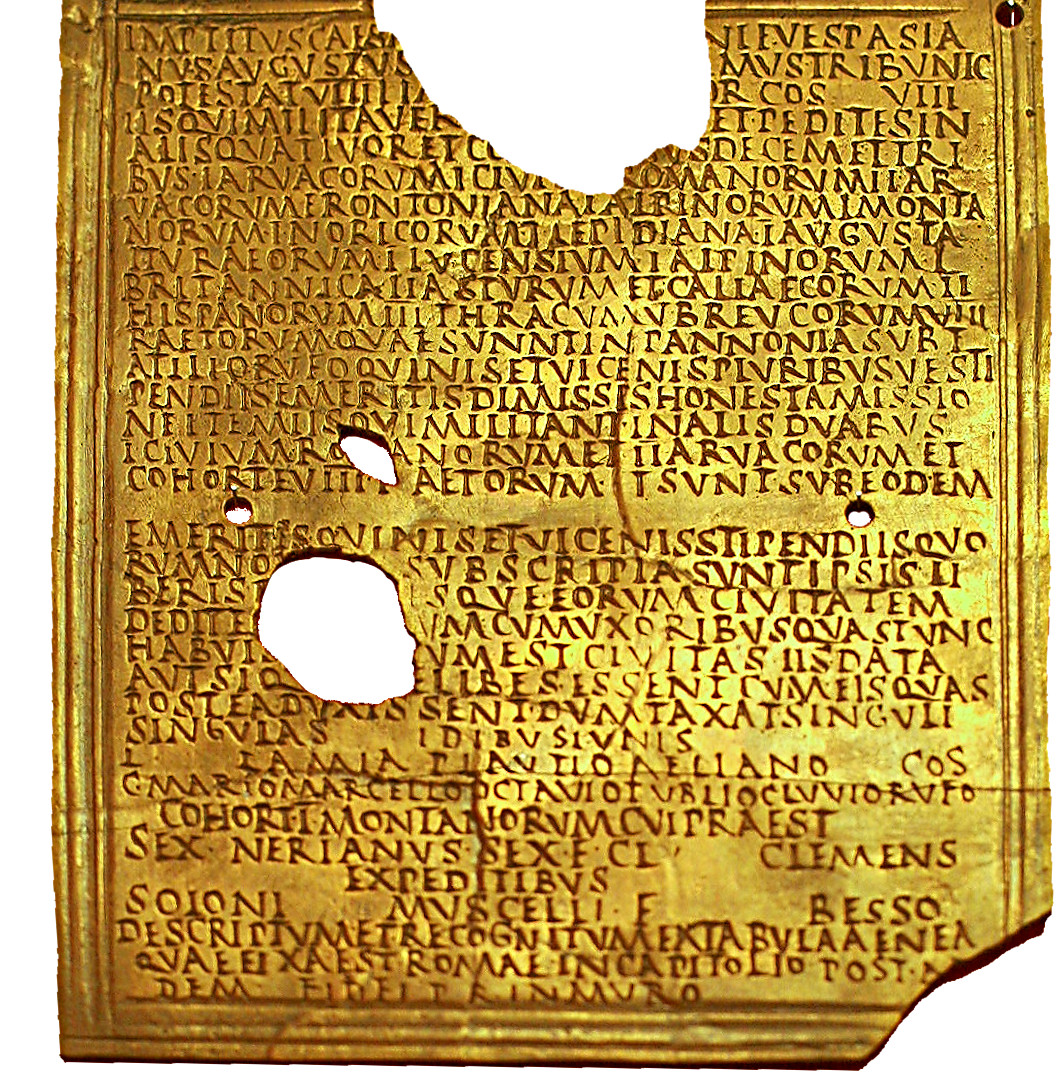
- Military diploma CIL XVI, 26, dated June 13th 80, attesting his governorship

suffect consul

Personal details
- Died: AD 85

Titus Atilius Rufus (died AD 85) was a Roman senator, who held several appointments during the reigns of Nero, Vespasian and Domitian. He was suffect consul in some nundinium prior to the year 80. He is known primarily from inscriptions.

Rufus is known to have been governor of three provinces. The first province he is known to have administered was a public one, Creta et Cyrenaica; Werner Eck dated this governorship to the year 67. Then he was a suffect consul, for, to govern the next two provinces, he would have been required to serve as consul previously. He was assigned the imperial province of Pannonia, where he is attested by a military diploma, dated June 13 80; Eck dates his tenure there from 79 to 82. Immediately afterwards Rufus was appointed to the imperial province of Syria, where Eck dates his governorship from 82 to 85. According to Tacitus, Rufus died while governor of Syria; Tacitus' father-in-law Gnaeus Julius Agricola was mentioned as a possible successor to Atilius Rufus, but Domitian never offered it to Agricola.

Titus Atilius Rufus Titianus, the consul of 127, may be his son.

== See also ==
- Atilia gens
