= Publius Cluvius Maximus Paullinus =

2nd century Roman senator, soldier and official

Publius Cluvius Maximus Paullinus (died AD 157 or 158) was a Roman senator, who held a number of imperial appointments during the reigns of Hadrian and Antoninus Pius. He was suffect consul during an undetermined nundinium between 139 and 143. He is known entirely from inscriptions.

His relationship to Gaius Marius Marcellus Octavius Publius Cluvius Rufus, suffect consul in 78, is unknown. The polyonymous nature of the name of this earlier consul suggests he was born Publius Cluvius and adopted by one Gaius Marius Marcellus.

== Life ==
An inscription from Labicum, where Paullinus and his son Publius Cluvius Maximus Paullinus are buried, provides us the details of his cursus honorum. He began his career as a member of the quattuorviri viarum curandarum, or overseer of the streets and public places of Rome, one of the magistracies that comprised the vigintiviri; membership in one of these four boards was a preliminary and required first step toward a gaining entry into the Roman Senate. Next he was commissioned military tribune of Legio V Macedonica, at the time stationed at Troesmis in Moesia Inferior. He was then elected quaestor, which he served in the public province of Achaea. Upon completion of this traditional Republican magistracy he would be enrolled in the Senate. The traditional Republican magistracy of plebeian tribune followed, and after that praetor; Géza Alföldy dates the latter magistracy to the year 127 "at the latest".

After he completed his duties as praetor, Paullinus was entrusted with the important duty of acting as messenger between Hadrian and the Senate, delivering a letter to the emperor, who was in Africa at the time. The fact of Hadrian's location allows us to date this appointment by the Senate to the year 128; it is the only event in Paullinus' life we have a firm date for, and all of the other events we know about him are assigned dates based on this one event. This was followed by his appointment to prefectus frumenti dandi, or overseer of the grain supply for Rome; Alföldy assigns this appointment to the period 128 to 131. The next office listed on the inscription from Labicum is sevir equitum Romanorum, or the official presiding over the annual review of the equites in Rome. Its location here is odd: this office is usually held around the time one is quaestor. This abnormally raises the suspicion that what we have here is a stone-carver's mistake on the order of these offices; however, nothing else in the layout of the inscription suggests the carver had entered it in the wrong place, and in his discussion of this inscription Professor Alföldy accepts that it followed Paullinus' term as prefectus frumenti dandi.

This is followed by another item of interest: Paullinus was twice selected to serve as legatus or assistant to two different governors: the first was to the governor of Achaea, the second of Asia. Serving as a legatus provided an important opportunity for a younger Senator to form a bond with an older and more influential Senator. Alföldy dates the first tenure as legatus to the term 133/134, and the second to 134/135; However, Werner Eck would suggest tenures about two years earlier. These notices would gain more interest if the dating were either more precise or confident, for one could then identify the Senators Paullinus was a legatus for, and shed a little light on the relationships of the Roman Senate. If the dates Alföldy provides are correct, then he might have been legatus to Gaius Julius Severus consul in Achaea, and to Quintus Coredius Gallus Gargilius Antiquus in Asia. However, if Eck is correct about the dates, we do not have a name for the governor in Achaea, but the governor Paullinus served in Asia would have been Gaius Julius Alexander Berenicianus.

After completing his duties as a legatus to the proconsular governor of Asia, whoever he was, Paullinus received the province of Sicilia to govern; Alföldy dates this to the term 136/137, while Eck dates this earlier, to the term 133/134. After he returned to Rome, Paullinus received a commission to command Legio XIV Gemina, then stationed at Carnuntum; Alföldy dates his service from about the year 138 to 141, succeeding Titus Caesernius Statianus consul in 141. Paullinus then was appointed curator viae Flaminiae; Alföldy dates his tenure overseeing maintenance of that road immediately following his command of the XIV Gemina, from about the year 141 to 143, succeeding Lucius Aemilius Carus consul in 144.

Paullinus then entered his consulate, and the record of his life is not as detailed. From the inscription at Labicum, we know he became a member of the septemviri epulones. From another source we know he was appointed governor of Moesia Superior, which Alföldy dates from the year 146 to 149. If Ronald Syme is correct with his chronology, Paullinus was associated with a troublesome allocation of the province of Asia. Around the year 157 the sortition awarded this much-desired province to Herodes Atticus, but the rhetor declined the offer; next it was offered to another literary figure, Fronto, who was forced to decline the office due to his health. Paullinus accepted the office; however, he died before he could assume the governorship!
