= Quintus Caecilius Marcellus Dentilianus =

Quintus Caecilius Marcellus Dentilianus was a Roman senator, who held several imperial appointments during the reign of Antoninus Pius. He was suffect consul in an undetermined nundinium around AD 150. He is known entirely from inscriptions.

Dentilianus came from a family of Roman Africa, perhaps originally from Carthage. His father has been identified as Quintus Caecilius Marcellus, praetor around the year 115; although the name of his wife is not known, his son is identified as Quintus Caecilius Dentilianus, consul in 167.

== Life ==
His cursus honorum is known from an inscription set up at Thibiuca, north of Carthage. The earliest office Dentilianus held was in the decemviri stlitibus judicandis, one of the four boards that formed the vigintiviri; membership in one of these four boards was a preliminary and required first step toward a gaining entry into the Roman Senate. Next he was commissioned military tribune with Legio XI Claudia, stationed at Durostorum (modern Silistra) on the lower Danube. He returned to Rome where he assumed the traditional Republican magistracy of quaestor, served in the public province of Africa. Upon completion of this office Dentilianus would be enrolled in the Senate. Two more traditional Republican magistracies followed—plebeian tribune and praetor—both as candidate of the emperor Hadrian. Alföldy dates his tenure as praetor between the years 134 and 138.

After he completed his term as praetor, Dentilianus served as legatus proconsulis or assistant to governors of two public provinces. The first province was Crete and Cyrenaica; the second was Hispania Baetica. Alföldy dates his tenure in these positions, similar to modern internships and were held at the pleasure of the governors of those provinces, to successive years, c. 136/137 and c. 137/138 respectively. After these postings, the sortition gave Dentilianus the opportunity to govern a province on his own, which was Crete and Cyrenaica. This province was not favored by senators, due to its elements—the island of Crete and Cyrenaica in North Africa—were separated by the Mediterranean Sea, making governing the province more difficult. The date he governed this province lacks a firm date: Alföldy tentatively dates his tenure to the term 139/140, while Werner Eck dates it with less precision to either the last years of Hadrian's reign or the first few of Antoninus Pius. Dentilianus eventually received his first imperial appointment after this, a commission as legatus or commander of Legio XII Fulminata, which was stationed on the Eastern frontier, either in Cappadocia or Armenia; Alföldy dates his tenure in this post from circa 141 to circa 144. This was followed by an appointment as governor of the imperial province of Gallia Aquitania, which Alföldy between the years 146 and 149, or just prior to the time Dentilianus acceded to the consulate, while Eck dates it with less precision again to either the last years of Hadrian's reign or the first few of Antoninus Pius.

We lack details for his life after Dentilianus stepped down from the consulate. Alföldy dates his age when he left the consulate as at least 46; based on our knowledge of demographics of the Roman Empire, Dentilianus could be expected to live about 16 more years, so this silence may be more due to lack of information than he died shortly after his consulate.
