= Marcus Gavius Squilla Gallicanus (consul 127) =

Marcus Gavius Squilla Gallicanus was a Roman senator active during the first half of the second century AD. He was an ordinary consul for 127 as the colleague of Titus Atilius Rufus Titianus. Gallicanus is known only from inscriptions.

The origins of the family of Gallicanus lie in Verona; an inscription mentioning one M. Gavius M.f. Pob. Squillianus has been recovered from there.

== Family ==
Gallicanus was married to a woman named Pompeia Agrippinilla. Two men are known to be his sons: Marcus Gavius Squilla Gallicanus, ordinary consul in 150, and Marcus Gavius Orfitus, ordinary consul in 165.

== See also ==
- List of Roman consuls

Political offices
Preceded by Lucius Cuspius Camerinus, and Gaius Saenius Severus as suffect consul	Consul of the Roman Empire; 127 with Titus Atilius Rufus Titianus	Succeeded by Publius Tullius Varro, and Junius Paetus as suffect consul
