= Marcus Gavius Squilla Gallicanus =

Marcus Gavius Squilla Gallicanus was a Roman senator, who was active during the reigns of Antoninus Pius and Marcus Aurelius. He was suffect consul in 150 AD with Sextus Carminius Vetus as his colleague. He was also proconsular governor of Asia in 164/165.

The origins of his family lie in Verona; an inscription mentioning one M. Gavius M.f. Pob. Squillianus has been recovered from there. Gallicanus was the son of Marcus Gavius Squilla Gallicanus, consul in 127; his brother was Marcus Gavius Orfitus, ordinary consul in 165.

Gallicanus is known to have had at least two children. His son was Marcus Gavius Cornelius Cethegus, consul in 170; who was his legatus or assistant while proconsular governor of Asia. Gallicanus also had a daughter, Cornelia Cethegilla. Olli Salomies, in his monograph on the naming practices of the Early Roman Empire, records a number of experts who thought Cethegus and his sister were not natural, but adopted children of Gallicanus. After discussing the evidence, Salomies admits that he prefers the explanation that both "were Squilla Gallicanus' adoptive, not natural children."

That he was one of the witnesses to the Tabula Banasitana (AE 1971, 534) shows Gallicanus was still alive 6 July 177. His life after that point is a blank.

Political offices
Preceded by Quintus Passienus Licinus, and Gaius Julius Avitus as suffect consuls	Suffect consul of the Roman Empire; 150 with Sextus Carminius Vetus	Succeeded by [---]mus, and Gaius Laberius Priscus as suffect consuls
