= Gaius Curtius Justus =

2nd century Roman senator, consul and governor

Gaius Curtius Justus was a Roman senator who held several posts in the emperor's service during the Antonine dynasty. He was suffect consul in 150 with Gaius Julius Julianus as his colleague. Justus is known primarily through surviving inscriptions, although he could be identical with the Curtius Justus mentioned as a scriptor rei rusticae by Gargilius Martialis (2.1.4,7).

== Life ==
Based on his membership in the Pollia tribe, Justus' origin is thought to be in north Italy. His cursus honorum is known from an inscription set up at Ulpia Traiana Sarmizegetusa in modern Romania. His career began in his teens as one of the quattuorviri viarum curandarum, or overseers of the maintenance of the public roads of Rome. This was one of the four boards that comprised the vigintiviri; membership in the vigintiviri was a preliminary and required first step toward a gaining entry into the Roman Senate. Next Justus was elected quaestor, which he served this at Rome, and upon completion of this traditional Republican magistracy he would be enrolled in the Senate. After this Hadrian adlected him inter tribunicos. Justus completed this portion of his Senatorial career as peregrine praetor.

Justus served what Anthony Birley considered "a rather lengthy series of appointments between the praetorship and consulship". First were a series of appointments in Rome: sevir equitum Romanorum, praefectus frumenti dandi, and curator of several Italians roads -- the via Clodia, Annia, Cassia and Ciminia. This was followed with a commission as legatus legionis or commander of Legio XX Valeria Victrix during the reign of Antoninus Pius, which at the time was stationed in Roman Britain. Later in Pius' reign, Justus was proconsul of a public province, most likely Sicily, then governor of Dacia. In a footnote, Birley cites Werner Eck as observing that none of the ten known praefectura frumenti dandi of the period AD 70-138 continued to a consular office.

Dates for the last three offices can be inferred. Working backwards, since he was governor of Dacia prior to being suffect consul, and his tenure probably lasted three years, we can surmise he was governor c. 147-c. 150; this was preceded by a year as proconsul. His time with Legio XX Valeria Victrix, Birley concludes, "may thus have coincided with the campaigns of Quintus Lollius Urbicus, but, at all events, may be assigned to the early or mid-140s." Working forwards, since his adlection was an act of Hadrian, his praetorship was, at the latest, not very long after 138, the year of Hadrian's death. Géza Alföldy dates this magistracy around the year 135. An inscription found in Milan also attests that Justus was a member of the sodales Augustales, a prominent Roman priesthood.

Justus is known to have held one consular post, governor of Moesia Superior; his tenure is attested by an incomplete military diploma that can be dated to either 158 or 159.

== Family ==
Although the name of his wife is not known, her existence can be inferred from the presence of Gaius Curtius Pollia Rufinus, tribunus laticlavius of Legio XIII Gemina, which was stationed in Dacia during Justus' governorship.

Political offices
| Preceded by Marcus Cassius Apollinaris; Marcus Petronius Mamertinus as suffect consuls | Roman consul AD 150 (suffect) with Gaius Julius Julianus | Succeeded by Sextus Quintilius Condianus; Sextus Quintilius Valerius Maximus as ordinary consuls |
