= Lucius Atilius (jurist) =

Ancient Roman jurist

Lucius Atilius, of the Atilia gens, was a jurist of ancient Rome, who lived around the 2nd century BCE.

The 2nd century jurist Sextus Pomponius called him "Publius Atilius", and in some manuscripts of Cicero, he is called "Acilius", not "Atilius".

He was among the earliest of the jurisconsults, after Tiberius Coruncanius, who gave public instruction in law, and he was remarkable for his expertise in teaching. He was the first Roman who was called by the people Sapiens ("the Wise"), although, before his time, the jurist Publius Sempronius Sophus (who was consul in 304 BCE) had acquired the cognomen Sophus, less expressive to Latin ears. Sapiens was afterwards a title frequently given to jurists.

He wrote commentaries on the laws of the Twelve Tables.
