= Nepo =

Nepo may refer to:

- Nepo, an orca captured in 1969 and featured in the 1977 film Orca
- Nepo (language), an Esperanto-based constructed language which served as a model for a Slavic version from 1915 called Neposlava
- A nickname for Ian Nepomniachtchi, Russian chess player
- A shortening of nepotism, as in the phrase "nepo baby"
- Nepovirus, genus of viruses
