= Aulus Platorius Nepos =

2nd century AD Roman senator, soldier and governor

Aulus Platorius Nepos was a Roman senator who held a number of appointments in the imperial service, including the governorship of Britain. He was suffect consul succeeding the consul posterior Publius Dasumius Rusticus as the colleague of the emperor Hadrian for March to April 119 AD.

Anthony Birley notes that Nepos' career "in two important respects was an unusual one for a governor of Britain. In the first place, it is the only example recorded before the time of Severus Alexander of a man who had begun his career in the least favored post in the vigintivirate, the tresviri capitales, later receiving an emperor's backing in his candidature for a higher post.... Secondly, this is only one of three known instances (the others being those of L. Flavius Silva (ord. 81) and C. Bruttius Praesens (II ord. 139) of such men proceeding to the consulship after a single senior praetorian appointment."

== Life ==
It is unclear where he was born and raised, but because he was explicitly described as a friend of the emperor Hadrian before his accession, and both share the same tribe (Sergia), Birley states that it is "not improbable" that Nepos came from Southern Spain; he notes that the nomen Platorius is attested in Baetica. In the final years of the 1st century Nepos served as a military tribune with Legio XXII Primigenia at Mainz under the eye of the governor of Germania Superior, who brought him to the attention of Trajan, who, in turn, directly supported his candidacy for senatorial offices. Nepos likely became praetor in 111, then curator of the three roads in Etruria in 112 and 113 before becoming legate of Legio I Adiutrix during Trajan's Parthian campaigns. Upon Hadrian assuming the imperial throne, Nepos was made governor of Thracia, then suffect consul in the spring of 119. Shortly afterwards he was made governor of Germania Inferior, and while governor received Hadrian during his tour in 121. He accompanied Hadrian to Britain in 122, when he was made governor of that province, and oversaw the construction of Hadrian's Wall. He probably brought Legio VI Victrix with him from the continent to assist in the construction and perhaps to replace Legio IX Hispana which had left around 108. His tenure as governor of Roman Britain is securely dated by two military diplomas, one dated to 17 July 122, and the other to 15 September 124.

Nepos sought no further office after his time in Britain. Bricks bearing his name, and dated to 134, show he owned a brickworks near Rome. At some point Nepos held the augurate. The Historia Augusta twice records how Hadrian came to dislike his old friend, which Birley attempts to explain, for the Historia is considered an unreliable source. Birley suggests that A. Platorius Nepos Calpurnianus, curator of the Tiber in 161, was his son.

Political offices
Preceded by Hadrian III, and Publius Dasumius Rusticus as ordinary consuls	Suffect consul of the Roman Empire; AD 119 with Hadrian III	Succeeded by Marcus Paccius Silvanus Quintus Coredius Gallus Gargilius Antiquus, and Quintus Vibius Gallus as suffect consuls
Preceded by Quintus Pompeius Falco	Roman governors of Britain c.122-c.124	Succeeded by possibly Trebius Germanus
