= Lucius Atilius (tribune 311 BC) =

Ancient Roman politician

Lucius Atilius, of the Atilia gens, was a politician of ancient Rome who lived around the 4th century BCE.

He served as tribune of the plebs in 311 BCE, during which time he brought forward a bill, with his colleague Gaius Marcius Rutilus Censorinus, giving the people the power of electing 16 military tribunes in the four legions, the usual number levied annually. As there were six tribunes in each legion, the people by this bill had the election of two-thirds of the whole number. Previously they appointed only six; the remaining eighteen were nominated by the consuls.
