= Tabula Banasitana =

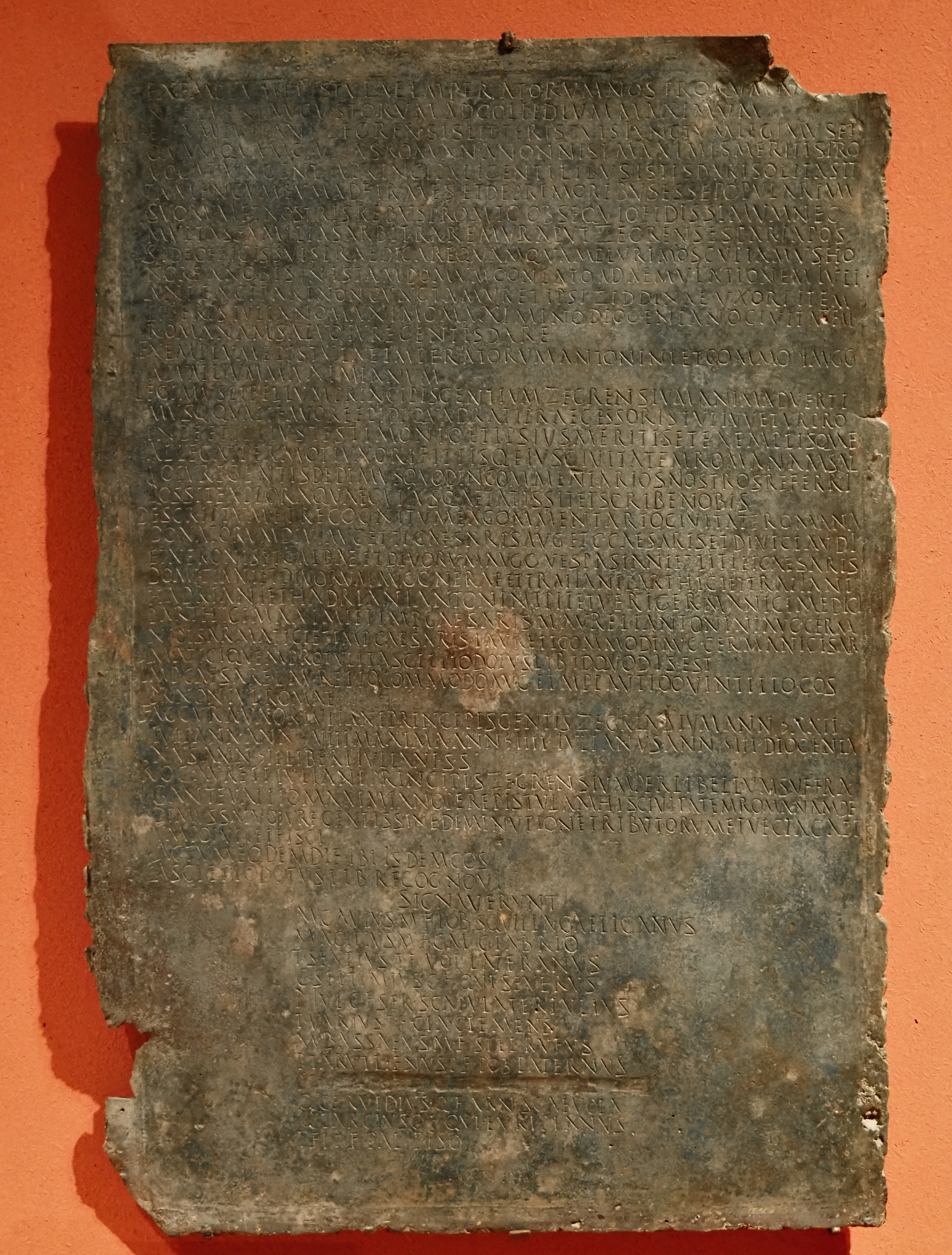
- Material: Bronze
- Created: Second century AD
- Place: Banasa
- Present location: Rabat

Tabula Banasitana is an inscribed bronze tablet produced in the second century AD. Found in 1957 near the village of Banasa in Morocco, it documents how a notable of the Berber tribe of Zegrenses successfully petitioned to receive Roman citizenship for him and his family. Fergus Millar has noted its importance as "perhaps our finest documentary item of evidence for the archival procedures of the Roman emperors and for the limits and consequences of granting citizenship, as well as affording some glimpses of social structure in a marginal area of the empire." The text was published for the first time in 1971. The tablet is currently at the Museum of History and Civilizations in Rabat.

The Latin text on the tablet consists of three parts, probably collected and published by Aurelius Julianus himself: a grant from the emperors Marcus Aurelius and Lucius Verus to the Zegrensis Julianus, his wife Ziddina and their four sons in 168/169; a second grant from Marcus Aurelius and Commodus to Faggura, the wife of Aurelius Julianus, the princeps of the Zegrenses, probably the son of the earlier Julianus, and their children in 177; and an accurate copy of the entry from the central register with the names of twelve senior figures, senators and equestrians, who probably formed the Consilium principis and who are listed with their full Roman names as witnesses to the reliability of the transcript from which the Tabula Banasitana is a copy. The texts contain some linguistic peculiarities, some of which are disputed as to whether they are errors or merely different spellings. There are also some legal irregularities, but these do not seem to have bothered the Roman authorities.

== Bibliography ==
- Eck, Werner (2018). "Die Wirksamkeit des römischen Rechts im Imperium Romanum und seinen Gesellschaften" [The functioning of Roman law in the Imperium Romanum and its societies]. In Lo Cascio, Elio; Mantovani, Dario (eds.). Diritto romano e economia. Due modi di pensare e organizzare il mondo (nei primi tre secoli dell'Impero). Pavia University Press. pp. 747–782. ISBN 978-88-6952-094-5.
- Forssman, Bernhard (1975). "Zur «Tabula Banasitana»". Antiquités africaines. 9: 157–158. (with response by William Seston and Maurice Euzennat).
- Liebs, Detlef (1976). "Nachrichten aus Banasa über Taruttienus Paternus und Cervidius Scaevola" [News from Banasa about Taruttienus Paternus and Cervidius Scaevola]. Zeitschrift der Savigny-Stiftung für Rechtsgeschichte: Romanistische Abteilung. 93: 291–297.
- MacKendrick, Paul Lachlan (2000). The North African Stones Speak. UNC Press Books. ISBN 978-0-8078-4942-2.
- Millar, Fergus (1983). "Epigraphy". In Crawford, Michael (ed.). Sources for Ancient History. Cambridge University Press. ISBN 978-0-521-28958-0.
- Rhorfi, Abdellatif (2002). "La Pax romana en Tingitane et les conditions de sa permanence aux trois premiers siècles ap. J.-C". L'Africa Romana (XV). Rome: 560.
- Schillinger-Häfele, Ute (1977). "Der Urheber der Tafel von Banasa" [The creator of the Banasa plaque]. Chiron. 7: 323–331.
- Seston, William; Euzennat, Maurice (1971). "Un dossier de la chancellerie romaine : La Tabula Banasitana. Étude de diplomatique". Comptes rendus des séances de l'Académie des Inscriptions et Belles-Lettres. 115 (3): 468–490. doi:10.3406/crai.1971.12653.
