= Publius Dasumius Rusticus =

2nd century Roman senator and consul

Publius Dasumius Rusticus was a Roman senator active during the first half of the second century AD. He was eponymous consul for AD 119 as the colleague of the emperor Hadrian. Rusticus is known only through surviving inscriptions.

Rusticus poses a mystery to historians of the period. He is known only from his consulship, yet as the colleague of the emperor, a very prestigious honor; why he received this honor is unknown. It may be that he was a childhood friend or associate of Hadrian's, but Ronald Syme notes that, in Baetica, the home province of Hadrian, only six people with the gentilicum "Dasumius" are known—and none in the other Spanish provinces.

For some time, he was thought to be the testator of the Testamentum Dasumii. The grounds for this identification was first proposed by Bartolomeo Borghesi: that an heir in the will named "Dasumia" was assumed to be his daughter, and thus his gentilicum was "Dasumius". This argument was widely accepted, forcing experts to assume the testator was Lucius Dasumius Hadrianus, proconsul of Asia (106/107), then later Rusticus, until a new piece of the inscription was identified which invalidated Borghesi's argument. The identity of the testator of the Testamentum remains unknown.

As an adjunct of his supposed association with the Testamentum Dasumii, Rusticus was thought to be the adoptive father of Lucius P.f. Dasumius Tullius Tuscus, consul in 152; but, on learning that the testator's name was not Dasumius, there is no evidence to connect the two, although Olli Salomies notes "the adoptive father -- who seems to be otherwise unknown -- was certainly related to Rusticus."

Political offices
Preceded by Lucius Pomponius Bassus, and Titus Sabinius Barbarus as Suffect consuls	Consul of the Roman Empire; 119 with Hadrian III	Succeeded by Hadrian III, and Aulus Platorius Nepos
