= Quintus Lollius Urbicus =

2nd-century senator, military commander and governor

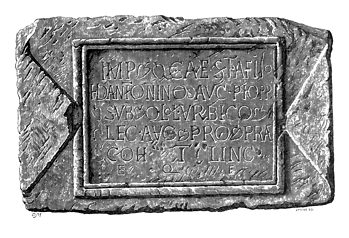
- CIL VII, 1041

Governor of Roman Britain
- In office c. 139 AD – c. 142 AD
- Preceded by: Publius Mummius Sisenna
- Succeeded by: Gnaeus Papirius Aelianus

Personal details
- Born: c. 109 AD Tiddis, Africa Proconsularis, Roman Empire
- Died: c. 160 AD Rome, Italy. Roman Empire
- Parent(s): Marcus Lollius Senecio, Grania Honorata
- Occupation: Governor
- Known for: Bar Kokhba Revolt

Quintus Lollius Urbicus was a Berber governor of Roman Britain between the years 139 and 142, during the reign of the Emperor Antoninus Pius. He is named in the Historia Augusta, although it is not entirely historical, and his name appears on five Roman inscriptions from Britain; his career is set out in detail on a pair of inscriptions set up in his native Tiddis near Cirta (Constantine, Algeria), Numidia.

== Early life ==
Lollius Urbicus was the son of Marcus Lollius Senecio, who was a Berber landowner, and his wife Grania Honorata. Professor Edward Champlin included Adventus as a member of "a Cirtan community at Rome" he infers existed there, whose members included: Publius Pactumeius Clemens, consul in 138; Gaius Arrius Antoninus, consul c. 170; and the orator Marcus Cornelius Fronto. Champlin notes that Urbicus, along with Pactumeius Clemens, would later be useful patrons for Fronto at the beginning of the orator's career.

== Early career ==
The early senatorial career of Lollius Urbicus is known from a detailed inscription erected in Tiddis. After a military tribunate with the Legio XXII Primigenia at Mogontiacum (present-day Mainz), he entered the Senate and served for a year as legate to the proconsul of Asia. He quickly rose to prominence as emperor Hadrian's candidate, and received a commission as legatus or commander of the Legio X Gemina at Vienna. He received dona militaria, or military decorations, for his service as a legate during Hadrian's Jewish War of 132–135. His consulship can be placed in 135 or 136, after which he governed Germania Inferior. He was transferred to Britannia soon after Hadrian's death.

== Governor of Britain ==
According to the Augustan History, the emperor Antoninus Pius "defeated the Britons through the agency of the legate Lollius Urbicus". It seems that, in a reversal of Hadrianic policy in Britain, he sent Lollius Urbicus to effect the reconquest of Lowland Scotland. Between 139 and 140 Urbicus refurbished the fort at Corbridge, in preparation for the move north of Hadrian's Wall, and commemorative coins were issued in 142 celebrating a victory in Britain. It is therefore likely that Urbicus led the reoccupation of southern Scotland in 141 including the capture of Burnswark Hill, using all three legions and a variety of auxiliary units. In 143 he oversaw the initial construction of the Antonine Wall; he is explicitly named on building inscriptions from Balmuildy.

No historical source describes the Antonine invasion, so any attempted reconstruction will be purely speculative. Urbicus may have campaigned against several British tribes (possibly including factions of the northern Brigantes), certainly against the lowland tribes of Scotland; the Votadini and the Selgovae of the Scottish Borders region, also the Damnonii of Strathclyde and the Novantae of Dumfries and Galloway. All three of the legions of Britain would have taken part (Legio II Augusta based at Caerleon, the Sixth Victrix based at York and the Twentieth Valeria Victrix based at Chester), as they are all mentioned on the inscriptions recording building work undertaken along the Antonine Wall. This legionary core was, no doubt, backed up by a substantial contingent of auxiliary units, of which we have record of around nine regiments (e.g. RIB 1276, 2140, 2142, 2149, 2155, 3509).

It seems likely that Urbicus planned his campaign of attack from Corbridge in Northumberland, just to the rear of Hadrian's Wall, as dedicatory inscriptions positively dated to the early 140s have been uncovered at the Antonine storage-depot there. From here he drove north-north-west into the Scottish Borders along the Agricolan military road Dere Street, leaving garrison forts at High Rochester in Northumberland and possibly also at Newstead in the Borders, as he struck towards the Firth of Forth. Both of these sites, as well as similar military installations at Risingham, Chew Green, Cappuck and Inveresk, were very likely used as bases from which to police the lowland tribes, namely the Votadini to the east and the Selgovae to the west.

Having secured an overland supply route for military personnel and equipment along Dere Street, Urbicus very likely set up a supply port at Carriden for the supply of grain and other foodstuffs before proceeding against the Dumnonii tribe in South Strathclyde. This done, then came the task of completing a new barrier of turf and timber stretching for thirty-five miles from east to west across the narrow neck of land separating the mighty Rivers Forth and Clyde, nowadays known as the Antonine Wall.

== Later career ==
Urbicus returned to Rome with the prospect of the prestigious post of praefectus urbi (Prefect of Rome), which he probably held in AD 146, after the death of the incumbent, Sextus Erucius Clarus. He was perhaps the praefectus urbi who is known to have died in AD 160.

One recorded activity of Urbicus while praefectus urbi was his presiding at the trial of one Ptolemaeus, who had been accused by her ex-husband of being a Christian; she admitted to the prefect that she was indeed a Christian and was sentenced to death. This trial led Justin Martyr, who had converted her, to write his Apology to plead for her life.

Citing Urbicus' career inscription, Colin Wells concludes that: "At no other period of history could the second or third son of a Berber landowner from a very small town in the interior enjoy a career which took him to Asia, Judaea, the Danube . . . the lower Rhine and Great Britain, culminating in a position of great power and honor in the capital of the empire to which all these regions belonged."

== See also ==
- Lollia (gens)

== Notes ==
Political offices
Unknown Title last held by Publius Mummius Sisenna	Roman governors of Britain; Between 139 and 142	Succeeded by Gnaeus Papirius Aelianus
