= Maurice Euzennat =

French historian and archaeologist (1926–2004)

- Born: Maurice, Joseph, Gaston Euzenna; 15 November 1926; Mont-Saint-Aignan
- Died: 25 July 2004 (aged 77); Aix-en-Provence
- Occupation(s): Historian; Epigrapher

Maurice Euzennat (15 November 1926 – 25 July 2004) was a French historian and archaeologist.

== Career ==
After he passed his agrégation in history and resided at the école française de Rome between 1951 and 1954, Maurice Euzennat made a part of his career in Morocco. Back in 1963, he created a French department of underwater archeology and activated the ship Archéonaute.

Maurice Euzennat worked on the history and civilization of ancient Rome, North Africa during Antiquity and also Gallia Narbonensis. He led excavations including one on the archaeological site of Volubilis. In addition, he conducted a study of Hanno's voyage.

== Bibliography ==
- Jean-Pierre Callu: Allocution à la mémoire de M. Maurice Euzennat, membre de l'Académie. In Comptes rendus des séances de l'Académie des Inscriptions et Belles-Lettres. 148. Jahrgang (2004), p. 1180
- Georges Souville: Maurice Euzennat (19262004). In: Antiquités Africaines. Volume 41–42 (2004–2005), p. 5.
