= Nepos (Roman governor) =

Roman governor

Licinius Nepos lived during the reign of the emperor Trajan. Pliny the Younger, a Roman writer, mentions Licinius Nepos in his letters. Pliny describes him as a praetor, who is so brave and strong that he is unafraid to punish even senators. Ronald Syme has proposed identifying him with the suffect consul of 127, M. Licinius Celer Nepos.
