= Sosia gens =

Ancient Roman family

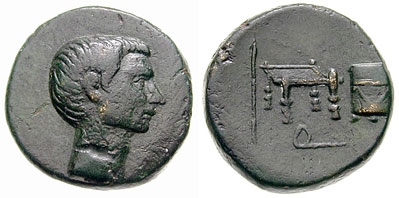
Coin of Gaius Sosius, consul in 32 BC. The implements and initial 'Q' on the reverse allude to his term as quaestor.

The gens Sosia, occasionally written Sossia, was a plebeian family at ancient Rome. Members of this gens occur in history from the end of the Republic down to the third century AD. The first of the Sosii to attain the consulship was Gaius Sosius in 32 BC, and the family would continue holding various positions in the Roman state until the third century.

== Praenomina ==
The praenomina associated with the Sosii of the Republic were Quintus, Titus and Gaius. The Sosii Falcones of imperial times used Quintus and Marcus. All of these were extremely common throughout Roman history.

== Branches and cognomina ==
The original Italian members of the gens were probably of Picentine origin. A distinct family of Sosii appears prominently in the Senate during the reign of Emperor Domitian onward, and its progenitors seem to have been easterners. It is likely that an ancestor of theirs received Roman citizenship from Gaius Sosius, when the latter had served as governor of Syria and Cilicia during the time of the Second Triumvirate.

The Sosii of the Republic bore no cognomina, and were not divided into distinct families. In the second century, however, a family bearing the name of Sosius Falco appears, descended from a daughter of Quintus Sosius Senecio, consul in AD 99 and 107, who married Quintus Pompeius Falco, consul in 109. Senecio, the original surname, was derived from senex, an old man, while Falco, a falcon, was inherited from the Pompeii; it frequently denoted someone whose feet resembled talons; the modern expression is "pigeon-toed". Priscus, borne by some of the same family, was a common surname meaning "old" or "elder".

== Members ==
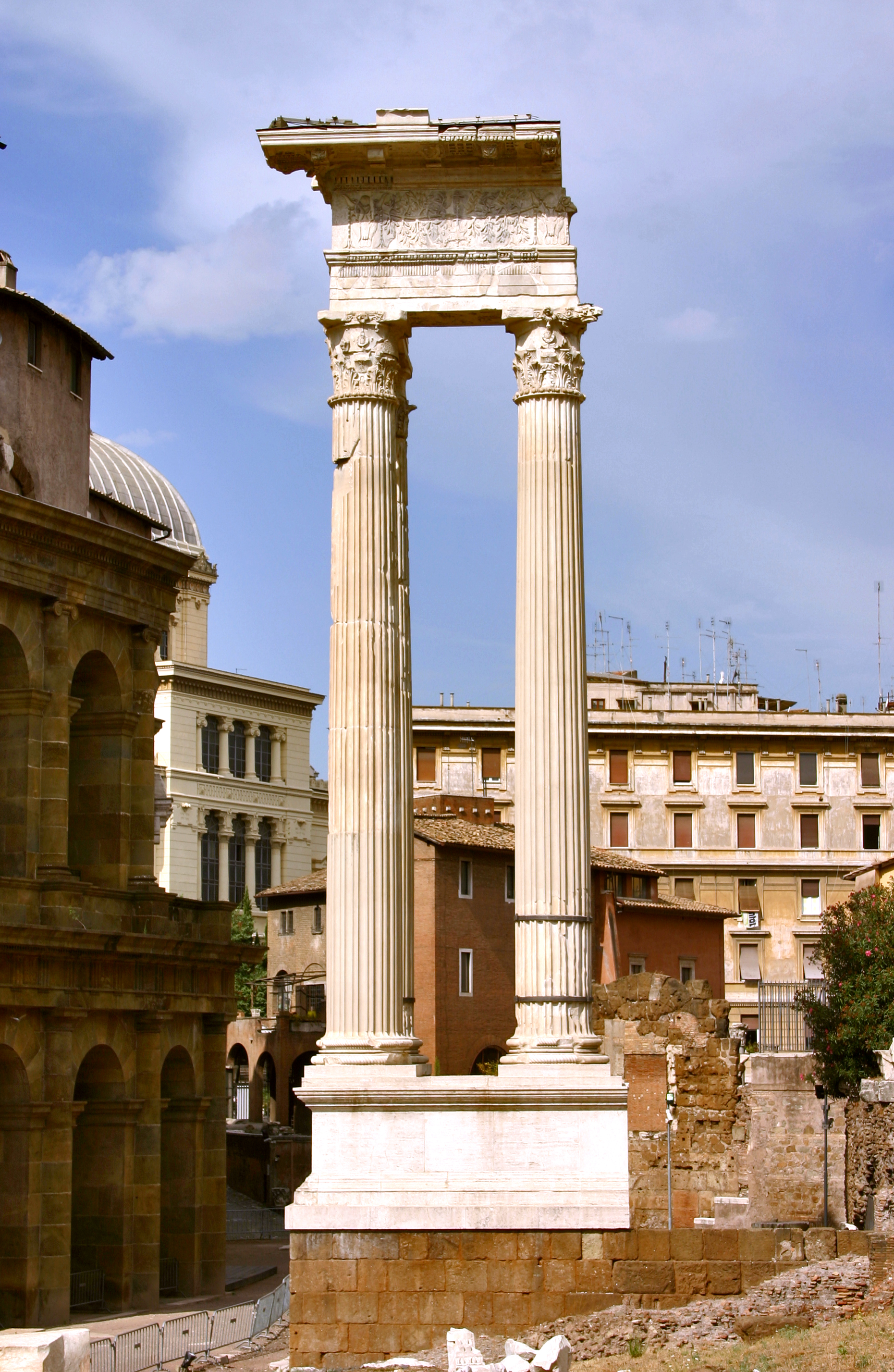
Columns from the Temple of Apollo Sosianus, rebuilt by Gaius Sosius about 34 BC

This list includes abbreviated praenomina. For an explanation of this practice, see filiation.

- Quintus Sosius, an eminent eques from Picenum, who confessed to the crime of burning the public records' office in 83 BC.
- Titus Sosius, grandfather of the consul Gaius Sosius, and probably father of the praetor of 49 BC.
- Gaius Sosius T. f., quaestor of the consul Manius Lepidus in 66 BC, and praetor in 49 when, on the outbreak of the Civil War, he at first supported Pompeius, but submitted to Caesar upon the former's flight from Italy. He was father of the consul of 32 BC.
- Gaius Sosius C. f. T. n., a staunch partisan of the triumvir Marcus Antonius, celebrated a triumph in 34 BC for installing Herod as king of the Jews. Consul in 32, he openly opposed Octavian, and commanded part of Antonius' fleet at Actium, but was later pardoned by Octavian.
- Sosius, and his brother, were booksellers at Rome, mentioned by Horace. They may have been freedmen of the senatorial Sosii.
- Sosia Galla, the wife of Gaius Silius, consul in AD 13 and legate under Germanicus, was a close friend of Agrippina. In AD 24, Sosia and her husband were accused by Sejanus of corruption and plundering the provinces during Silius' command in Germany. Believing his cause hopeless, Silius took his own life, while Sosia was banished from Rome.
- Sosia Maxima, a Vestal Virgin.
- Sosius Papus, a friend of Hadrian, was honoured with a statue by the emperor Trajan. He might perhaps be the same person as the consul Quintus Sosius Senecio.
- Sosia Juncina, wife of Quintus Antonius Isauricus, consul suffectus in AD 140, dedicated an altar to the goddess Fortuna at Eboracum, where her husband was stationed as legate of the sixth legion in the 130's.

=== Sosii Falcones ===
- Quintus Sosius Senecio, consul in AD 99 and 107, married Julia, a daughter of Frontinus. He was a friend of Plutarch and the younger Pliny.
- Sosia Q. f. Frontina, a daughter of Quintus Sosius Senecio, named on the monument of her faithful slave, Eutychius.
- Sosia Q. f. Polla, married Quintus Pompeius Falco, consul in AD 109.
- Quintus Pompeius Sosius Q. f. Sex. n. Priscus, son of Pompeius Falco, and grandson of Sosius Senecio, was consul in AD 149.
- Quintus Pompeius Q. f. Q. n. Senecio Sosius Priscus, consul in AD 169.
- Marcus Sosius Laelianus Pontius Falco, one of the Salii Palatini, from AD 170 to 189.
- Quintus Pompeius Q. f. Q. n. Sosius Falco, consul in AD 193, narrowly escaped execution at the hands of Commodus, who was assassinated on the final day of 192. Dissatisfied with reforms of Pertinax, the praetorian guard proclaimed Falco emperor the following year, but Falco was spared when the attempt was put down, as he was widely believed to be innocent of any involvement.
- Sosia Q. f. Q. n. Falconilla, the sister of Quintus Pompeius Sosius Falco.
- Quintus Pompeius Q. f. Q. n. Falco Sosius Priscus, praetor circa AD 220 to 225.

== See also ==
- List of Roman gentes

== Bibliography ==
- Marcus Tullius Cicero, De Natura Deorum, Epistulae ad Atticum.
- Quintus Horatius Flaccus (Horace), Ars Poëtica (The Art of Poetry), Epistulae.
- Marcus Velleius Paterculus, Compendium of Roman History.
- Flavius Josephus, Antiquitates Judaïcae (Antiquities of the Jews), Bellum Judaïcum (The Jewish War).
- Gaius Plinius Caecilius Secundus (Pliny the Younger), Epistulae (Letters).
- Publius Cornelius Tacitus, Annales, Historiae.
- Lucius Mestrius Plutarchus (Plutarch), Lives of the Noble Greeks and Romans.
- Gaius Suetonius Tranquillus, De Vita Caesarum (Lives of the Caesars, or The Twelve Caesars).
- Appianus Alexandrinus (Appian), Bellum Civile (The Civil War).
- Lucius Cassius Dio Cocceianus (Cassius Dio), Roman History.
- Aelius Lampridius, Aelius Spartianus, Flavius Vopiscus, Julius Capitolinus, Trebellius Pollio, and Vulcatius Gallicanus, Historia Augusta (Augustan History).
- Dictionary of Greek and Roman Biography and Mythology, William Smith, ed., Little, Brown and Company, Boston (1849).
- Theodor Mommsen et alii, Corpus Inscriptionum Latinarum (The Body of Latin Inscriptions, abbreviated CIL), Berlin-Brandenburgische Akademie der Wissenschaften (1853–present).
- George Davis Chase, "The Origin of Roman Praenomina", in Harvard Studies in Classical Philology, vol. VIII, pp. 103–184 (1897).
- Paul von Rohden, Elimar Klebs, & Hermann Dessau, Prosopographia Imperii Romani (The Prosopography of the Roman Empire, abbreviated PIR), Berlin (1898).
- Syme, Ronald. The Roman Revolution. Oxford: Clarendon Press (1939). Archived.
- T. Robert S. Broughton, The Magistrates of the Roman Republic, American Philological Association (1952–1986).
- Jones, C. P. (1970). "Sura and Senecio". Journal of Roman Studies. 60 (1). Cambridge University Press (CUP): 98–104. doi:10.1017/s0075435800043288. ISSN 0075-4358. JSTOR 299416.
- Géza Alföldy, Konsulat und Senatorenstand unter der Antonien (The Consulate and Senatorial State under the Antonines), Rudolf Habelt, Bonn (1977).
- John C. Traupman, The New College Latin & English Dictionary, Bantam Books, New York (1995).
