= Pompeia gens =

Ancient Roman family

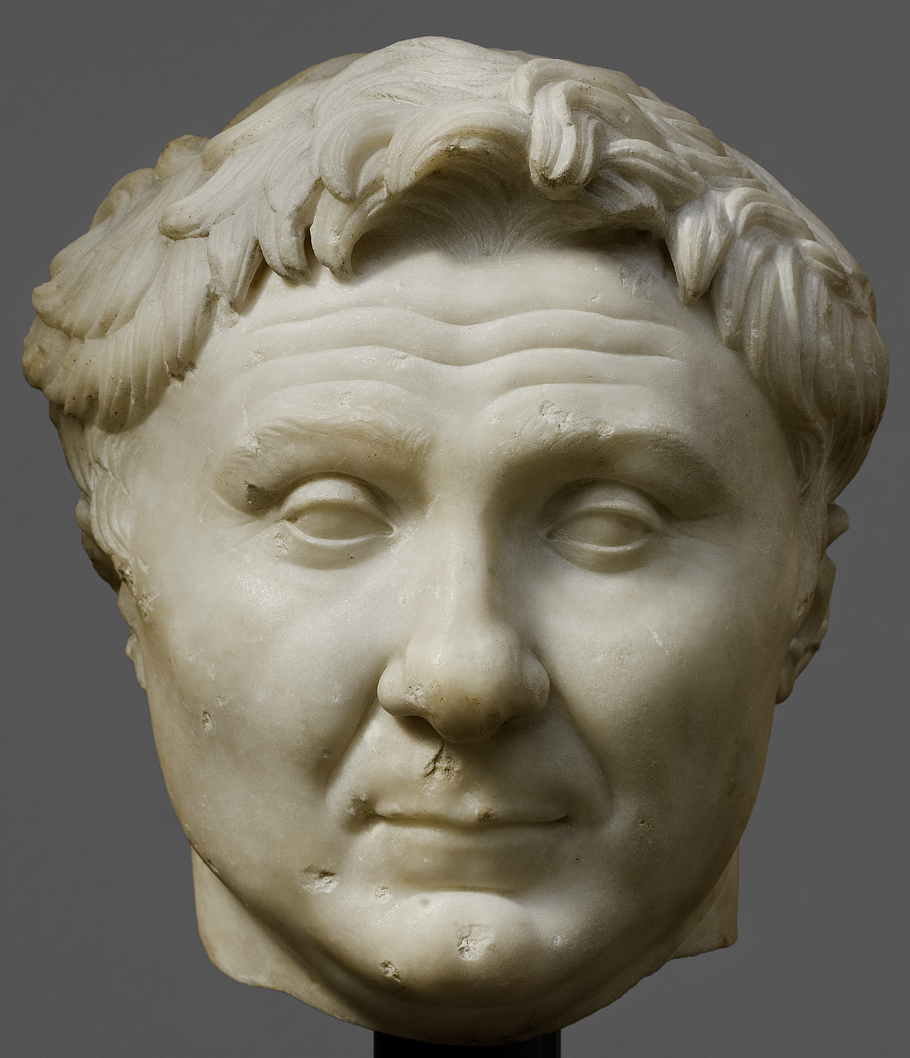
Gnaeus Pompeius Magnus, bust at Ny Carlsberg Glyptotek, Copenhagen.

The gens Pompeia was a plebeian family at ancient Rome, first appearing in history during the second century BC, and frequently occupying the highest offices of the Roman state from then until imperial times. The first of the Pompeii to obtain the consulship was Quintus Pompeius in 141 BC, but by far the most illustrious of the gens was Gnaeus Pompeius, surnamed Magnus, a distinguished general under the dictator Sulla, who became a member of the First Triumvirate, together with Caesar and Crassus. After the death of Crassus, the rivalry between Caesar and Pompeius led to the Civil War, one of the defining events of the final years of the Roman Republic.

== Origin ==
The nomen Pompeius (frequently anglicized as Pompey) is generally believed to be derived from the Oscan praenomen Pompo, equivalent to the Latin Quintus, and thus a patronymic surname. The gentilicia Pompilius and Pomponius, with which Pompeius is frequently confounded, were also derived from Pompo. The gentile-forming suffix -eius was typical of Sabine families, suggesting that the Pompeii were of Sabine or Oscan extraction. Cicero describes Quintus Pompeius, the consul of 141 BC, as a man of "humble and obscure origin".

Chase posits an alternative etymology: that Pompeius and similar names were instead derived from pompa, a procession, or a derived cognomen Pompo, meaning not "fifth", but a participant in a procession; but he concludes that all of these hypotheses are uncertain.

== Praenomina ==
The main praenomina of the Pompeii were Gnaeus, Quintus, and Sextus, each of which was used by the two main branches of the family under the Republic, as well as by other members. Individual families made use of Aulus and Marcus. All of these were common names throughout Roman history. A few Pompeii not associated with any of the major families of this gens used other praenomina.

== Branches and cognomina ==
According to Velleius Paterculus, the Pompeii of the Republic were divided into two or three distinct families, of which two can be reconstructed with a high degree of probability. How they were related is not known. They used almost entirely different sets of praenomina, which was unusual, since as a rule certain ancestral praenomina would be used by all of the branches of a gens, although others might be unique to individual stirpes.

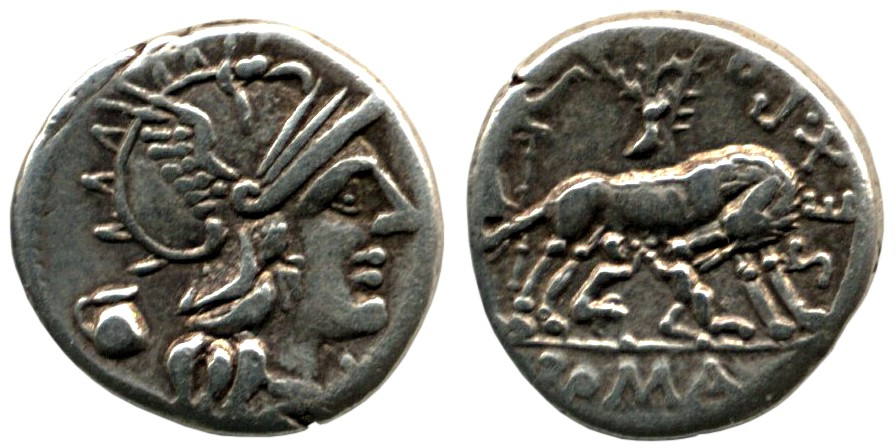
Denarius of Sextus Pompeius, paternal grandfather of Pompey the Great.

The first branch to appear at Rome acquired the surname Rufus, signifying someone with red hair, but it was only passed down through one line. The surname Bithynicus is also thought to have belonged to a branch of this family, although it is not certain how the name, a reference to Bithynia, was acquired, or precisely when.

The other branch, which played a conspicuous role in the final decades of the Republic and under the early Empire, mainly used personal cognomina, such as Strabo, Magnus, Pius, and Faustulus. Strabo, referring to someone with a pronounced squint, belonged to the father of the triumvir, and is said to have been the nickname of his cook, whose proper name was Menogenes; but it then became a nickname of Pompeius, because he resembled the cook.

Magnus, or "great", was originally an epithet of the triumvir, who won renown as a general under Sulla's command, and later on his own; his sons and some of their descendants also used the name to signify their connection to him. Pius, or "faithful", was assumed by the general's son, Sextus, to signify his filial devotion to pursue vengeance on behalf of his father and brother. Faustulus, found as a surname on the coins of a Sextus Pompeius, presumably a member of the same family, is a diminutive of Faustus, meaning "fortunate" or "lucky".

Various surnames were borne by other Pompeii, including a number of freedmen and their descendants, but the majority of the Pompeii who lived in the time of the Republic bore no cognomen.

== Members ==
This list includes abbreviated praenomina. For an explanation of this practice, see filiation.

- Lucius Pompeius, a military tribune in the army of the consul Publius Licinius Crassus in 171 BC, during the war against Perseus. His relationship to the two main families of the Republic is uncertain.
- Titus Pompeius T. f., a staff officer in the command of the consul Pompeius Strabo in 89 BC.
- Marcus Pompeius, (Note: Plutarch calls him Pomponius.) leader of the Roman cavalry under Lucullus during the war with Mithridates. He was captured after being wounded in battle.
- Quintus Pompeius Macula, a friend of Cicero, and the rival of Fulvius for the hand of Fausta Cornelia, the daughter of Sulla, who ultimately married Gaius Memmius.
- Pompeius Cn. l. Lenaeus, a learned Athenian, granted his freedom by Gnaeus Pompeius Magnus. Like Theophanes, Lenaeus became one of his former master's traveling companions, and later kept a school at Rome.
- Pompeius Cn. l. Vindullus, a freedman of Gnaeus Pompeius Magnus. He died at Laodicea in 50 BC.
- Pompeia, the wife of Publius Vatinius, tribune of the plebs in 59 BC. Cicero mentions her in a letter from 45.
- Gnaeus Pompeius, served under Caesar's legate, Quintus Titurius, in 54 BC, during the Gallic Wars.
- Titus Pompeius Reginus, a resident of Gallia Narbonensis, was excluded from his brother's will, a circumstance remarked upon by Varro and Valerius Maximus.
- Pompeius Varus, a companion of Horace, alongside whom he fought at the battle of Philippi. He was proscribed by the triumvirs, but later allowed to return home, perhaps as early as the Pact of Misenum, but more likely after the Battle of Actium, when Octavian pardoned some of those who had fought under Marcus Antonius.

=== Descendants of Aulus Pompeius ===
- Aulus Pompeius, father of the consul of 141 BC, was described as a flute-player, probably as a means of disparaging his son, who was a novus homo.
- Quintus Pompeius A. f., rose from humble origins to become consul in 141 BC. He secured election through duplicity, and received the province of Hispania Citerior. After suffering several military setbacks, he made a treaty on favourable terms to the Numantines, which he subsequently disavowed. He deftly avoided punishment for this and a charge of extortion made against him, and was censor in 131.
- (Quintus) Pompeius (Q. f. A. n.), an enemy of Tiberius Gracchus, who in 133 BC accused Gracchus of receiving the emblems of royalty from Eudemus of Pergamum, and threatened to bring him to trial. Drumann makes him the son of the consul of 141 BC, and identifies him with the Pompeius who was tribune of the plebs in 132, but this identification is very uncertain.
- Pompeia Q. f. A. n., the wife of Gaius Sicinius.
- Aulus Pompeius (Q. f. Q. n.), tribune of the plebs in 102 BC, denounced Battaces, who claimed to be the priest of the Magna Mater at Pessinus, and that the Romans had profaned her temple. Pompeius attempted to prevent him speaking from the rostra, but fell ill from a quinsy, which deprived him of speech; when he died soon thereafter, the people took it as a sign of the Magna Mater's displeasure.
- Quintus Pompeius Q. f. (Q. n.) Rufus, (Note: Broughton guesses that he might be a son of the consul of 141 BC, which is not impossible, despite the gap of fifty years between their consulships; Drumann makes him the grandson, and son of the Pompeius who was tribune of the plebs in 131.) tribune of the plebs in 99 BC, praetor urbanus in 91, and consul in 88. He opposed the tribune Publius Sulpicius and supported Sulla in his march on Rome, but was murdered by the soldiers of Pompeius Strabo, who was unwilling to hand his army over to Rufus.
- Quintus Pompeius Q. f. Q. n. Rufus, son of the consul of 88 BC, and Sulla's son-in-law, was murdered at the Forum in a riot instigated by the tribune Sulpicius.
- Quintus Pompeius Q. f. Q. n. Rufus, praetor in 63 BC, was sent to Capua in order to prevent a feared rebellion by the slaves of Campania and Apula in support of the conspiracy of Catiline. The following year, he was appointed governor of Africa, with the title of proconsul, and according to Cicero, carried out his office with great integrity.
- Pompeia Q. f. Q. n., granddaughter of Sulla, married Julius Caesar in 67 BC. In 62, as wife of the Pontifex Maximus, she hosted the mysteries of the Bona Dea, from which all men were excluded. Publius Clodius entered the house, disguised as a woman, allegedly for the purpose of seducing Pompeia, but was discovered. In the ensuing scandal, Caesar felt compelled to divorce Pompeia. (Note: This event, recalled in the proverb, "Caesar's wife must be above suspicion," attributed to Caesar, was not because Caesar himself suspected that Pompeia had intrigued with Clodius, but because, as Pontifex Maximus, the morals of his household could not be the subject of perpetual and malicious gossip.)
- Quintus Pompeius Q. f. Q. n. Rufus, grandson of Sulla, was tribune of the plebs in 52 BC, and a supporter of the triumvir Pompeius. He stoked feelings of panic at Rome, hoping to drive public support toward the triumvir, preventing the election of magistrates, and leading to a confrontation with the senate, following which the triumvir was appointed consul sine collega. He helped bring about the exile of Titus Annius Milo, but once he left office, Rufus was himself condemned and exiled.
- Quintus Pompeius A. f. (Q. n.) Bithynicus, (Note: Since his father's name was Aulus, Drumann makes Bithynicus a son of the tribune of 102 BC.) a close friend of Cicero, who describes him as an able orator, but criticizes his delivery. During the Civil War, he was a supporter of his cousin, Gnaeus Pompeius Magnus, whom he accompanied to Egypt after the Battle of Pharsalus. There, he was slain together with other supporters of Pompeius.
- Aulus Pompeius Q. f. A. n. Bithynicus, governor of Sicily at the time of Caesar's death in 44 BC. He wavered in his support of the various factions during the following months, and besought the help of Cicero. He initially opposed Sextus Pompeius' attempt to take possession of Messana, before agreeing to share the government of Sicily; but soon afterward, Sextus betrayed and murdered his cousin.
- Gnaeus Pompeius Q. f. Rufus, consul suffectus ex Kal. Oct. in 31 BC.

=== Descendants of Gnaeus Pompeius ===
- Gnaeus Pompeius, grandfather of Gnaeus Pompeius Strabo.
- Gnaeus Pompeius Cn. f., a senator in 129 BC. He was likely the uncle of Gnaeus Pompeius Strabo, the consul of 89 BC.
- Sextus Pompeius, praetor circa 120 and propraetor in Macedonia the following year, died in battle against the Celts. He was perhaps the same as the father of Pompeius Strabo.
- Sextus Pompeius Cn. f., father of Gnaeus Pompeius Strabo, married Lucilia, sister of the poet Gaius Lucilius. (Note: Velleius Paterculus erroneously calls her the mother, rather than the grandmother, of Gnaeus Pompeius Magnus.)
- Sextus Pompeius Sex. f. Cn. n., probably the elder brother of the consul Strabo, is described by Cicero as a man of great learning, but he does not appear to have pursued a political career.
- Gnaeus Pompeius Sex. f. Cn. n. Strabo, the father of Gnaeus Pompeius Magnus. As consul in 89 BC, during the Social War, he gained a number of important victories and received a triumph. During the civil war between Marius and Sulla, he instigated the murder of his commander, and his own cousin, the consul Quintus Pompeius. He was struck and killed by lightning in 87.
- Sextus Pompeius Sex. f. Sex. n., father of the consul of 35 BC.
- Quintus Pompeus Sex. f. Sex. n., known only from a letter of Cicero, in which he recommends Pompeius to a proconsul named Curius.
- Gnaeus Pompeius Cn. f. Sex. n. Magnus, also known as "Pompey the Great", rose to prominence in his youth as one of the generals of Sulla, and distinguished himself in Numidia and Spain, bringing an end to the civil war fought between the allies of Marius and Sulla. He cleared the Mediterranean of pirates, defeated Mithridates, and brought Asia Minor and Syria under Roman control. As members of the First Triumvirate, Pompeius, Caesar, and Crassus divided the Roman world between them. He was consul in 70, 55, and consul sine collega in 52, but his lack of foresight and prudence allowed his defeat by Caesar during the Civil War, in 48 BC.
- Pompeia Cn. f. Sex. n., sister of the triumvir, married Gaius Memmius, who served under Pompeius in Sicily in 81 BC, then to Spain, where he was killed during the war against Sertorius, in 75.
- Sextus Pompeius Sex. f. Sex. n., consul in 35 BC.
- Gnaeus Pompeius Cn. f. Cn. n. Magnus, elder son of the triumvir, commanded a fleet of fifty ships during the Civil War. After his father's death, he repaired to Spain, where he collected a substantial army. He was defeated at the Battle of Munda in 45 BC, and finally captured by soldiers under the command of Caesar's legate, Gaius Didius, who had him put to death.
- Sextus Pompeius Cn. f. Cn. n. Magnus Pius, younger son of the triumvir, accompanied his father to Egypt, where the elder Pompeius was murdered in 48 BC. Sextus commanded the remaining Pompeian forces in Africa until defeated at the Battle of Thapsus in 46. He avoided capture after the Battle of Munda. After Caesar's murder, he became associated with the republicans, and was proscribed by the new triumvirs. Despite gathering a substantial fleet, he was decisively defeated by Agrippa at the Battle of Naulochus in 36, and fled to the east, where he was captured and put to death.
- Pompeia Cn. f. Cn. n., daughter of the triumvir, married Faustus Cornelius Sulla, who was slain in 46 BC, during the African War. Released unharmed by Caesar, she married Lucius Cornelius Cinna, and was the mother of Gnaeus Cornelius Cinna Magnus, who later conspired against Augustus, but was pardoned and became one of the emperor's close friends.
- Pompeia Sex. f. Cn. n., granddaughter of the triumvir, was betrothed to Marcus Claudius Marcellus, the nephew of Augustus, but never married him.
- Sextus Pompeius Sex. f. Sex. n., consul in AD 14, pledged his loyalty to Tiberius upon the death of Augustus. He was a friend of Ovid, and should probably be identified as the same Sextus Pompeius who traveled to Asia with Valerius Maximus.
- Gnaeus Pompeius Magnus, probably the son of Marcus Licinius Crassus, the consul of AD 29, and Scribonia, the daughter of Lucius Scribonius Libo. He married Claudia Antonia, daughter of the emperor Claudius, but was brought down through the intrigues of the empress Messalina, and put to death.

=== Pompeii Macri et Macrini ===
- Gnaeus Pompeius Theophanes, a learned Greek who became an intimate friend of Gnaeus Pompeius Magnus during his campaigns in the east. Pompeius granted him Roman citizenship, and awarded his native Mytilene the status of a free city. Theophanes wrote a history of his patron's campaigns.
- Marcus Pompeius Cn. f. Macer Theophanes, appointed procurator of Asia by Augustus. He was a friend of Tiberius, but in AD 33, facing condemnation by that emperor, Theophanes' son and grandson took their own lives, reportedly because of the people of Lesbos paid divine honours to their family.
- Marcus Pompeius M. f. Cn. n. Macer, a respected eques, who, foreseeing condemnation and death at the hands of Tiberius, took his own life in AD 33.
- Quintus Pompeius M. f. M. n. Macer, praetor in AD 15, toward the beginning of the reign of Tiberius, suggested extending the lex Maiestatis, a law forbidding insult to the emperor. Toward the end of Tiberius' reign, Macer and his family found themselves facing condemnation, due to the divine honours paid to their ancestor, Gnaeus Pompeius Theophanes. He and his father took their own lives in AD 33.
- Pompeia M. f. M. n. Macrina, sister of the praetor, married Julius Argolicus, the son of Julius Laco. Her husband and father-in-law were put to death by Tiberius, and Pompeia was exiled in AD 33, as one of the descendants of Gnaeus Pompeius Theophanes.
- Marcus Pompeius Q. f. M. n. Macrinus Theophanes, perhaps the same Macrinus who was proconsul of Asia in AD 53.
- Marcus Pompeius M. f. Q. n. Macrinus Neos Theophanes, had a distinguished public career, serving as quaestor pro praetore of Bithynia and Pontus, tribune of the plebs, praetor urbanus, and curator of the Via Latina. He was consul suffectus in AD 115.
- Pompeia M. f. Q. n. Agrippinilla, married Marcus Gavius Squilla Gallicanus, consul in AD 127, and was the mother of Cornelia Cethegilla.
- Marcus Pompeius M. f. M. n. Macrinus, consul in AD 164.

=== Family of Pompeius Trogus ===
- Gnaeus Pompeius, a member of the Gallic tribe of the Vocontii, who fought alongside Gnaeus Pompeius Magnus during the war against Sertorius in Spain, and was rewarded with Roman citizenship. The historian Gnaeus Pompeius Trogus was his grandson.
- Pompeius Cn. f., uncle of the historian Trogus, led a cavalry squadron under Gnaeus Pompeius Magnus during the Third Mithridatic War.
- Pompeius Cn. f., father of the historian Trogus, served under the dictator Caesar, to whom he became secretary.
- Gnaeus Pompeius Cn. n. Trogus, the author of a history of the Macedonian kings, known as the Liber Historiarum Philippicarum, which formed the basis for the Historiarum Philippicarum of Justinus. He lived during the time of Augustus, since his history alludes to the recovery of the standards of Crassus from the Parthians, which occurred in 20 BC.

=== Pompeii Falcones ===
- Sextus Pompeius Falco, father of the consul of AD 108.
- Quintus Pompeius Sex. f. Falco, (Note: His full nomenclature was Quintus Roscius Coelius Murena Silius Decianus Vibullius Pius Julius Eurycles Herculanus Pompeius Falco. Birley traces elements of the name to three individuals: Gaius Julius Eurycles Herculanus Lucius Vibullius Pius, the "last representative of the dynasts of Sparta, who died not long after 130"; Lucius Silius Decianus, consul in AD 94, or perhaps one of his sons; and Marcus Roscius Murena Coelius, consul in 81. To this patrimony, Falco's descendants would add the names of his father-in-law, Quintus Sosius Senecio, consul in 99 and 107, and Senecio's father-in-law, Sextus Julius Frontinus, consul in 100.) consul suffectus in AD 108, and governor of Britain from AD 118 to 122, early in the reign of Hadrian, proconsul of Asia.
- Quintus Pompeius Q. f. Sex. n. Sosius Priscus, (Note: Like his son, he had an extremely long name due to the imperial fashion for combining the nomenclature of both paternal and maternal ancestors. Part of his name is missing, but the rest was: Quintus Pompeius [...] Bellicus Sollers Julius Acer Ducenius Proculus Rutilianus Rufinus Silius Valens Valerius Niger Claudius Fuscus Saxa Amyntianus Sosius Priscus, all of which was incorporated into his son's name, although Acer in this name should probably be amended to Aper, as given in his son's nomenclature.) son of Quintus Pompeius Falco and Sosia Polla, was consul in AD 149, and proconsul of Asia, probably in the early 160s.
- Quintus Pompeius Q. f. Q. n. Senecio Sosius Priscus, consul in AD 169. He had a distinguished career, and after his consulship was proconsul of Asia, like his father and grandfather before him. He is also remembered for having the longest attested name of the Roman aristocracy, including thirty-eight individual names. (Note: In full, his name was Quintus Pompeius Senecio Roscius Murena Coelius Sextus Julius Frontinus Silius Decianus Gaius Julius Eurycles Herculaneus Lucius Vibullius Pius Augustanus Alpinus Bellicius Sollers Julius Aper Ducenius Proculus Rutilianus Rufinus Silius Valens Valerius Niger Claudius Fuscus Saxa Amyntianus Sosius Priscus.)
- Quintus Pompeius Q. f. Q. n. Sosius Falco, consul in AD 193, narrowly avoided being put to death by Commodus, when the emperor was assassinated on the last day of 192. The Praetorian Guard offered him the throne, which he declined, and he was spared by Pertinax.
- Quintus Pompeius Q. f. Q. n. Falco Sosius Priscus, was quaestor under Caracalla. He subsequently served as pontifex, and was praetor designatus.

=== Pompeii of imperial times ===
- Pompeius Grosphus, a wealthy resident of Sicily under the early Empire. One of Horace's odes cautions Grosphus about an inordinate desire for wealth; but in one of his letters, he describes Grosphus as a man whose honourable intentions could be safely relied upon.
- Pompeius Silo, a renowned orator, much admired by his contemporary, Seneca the Elder.
- Pompeius Paulinus, praefectus annonae (c. 49–54), and father of the senator of the same name.
- Pompeius Urbicus, put to death by Claudius, as one of those involved in the clandestine marriage of Messalina to Gaius Silius, in AD 48.
- Marcus Pompeius Silvanus, consul suffectus in AD 45, was probably the same Pompeius Silvanus who, as governor of Dalmatia at the death of Nero, threw his support to Vespasian. Although he contributed little to the war, he joined the victorious emperor's generals as they entered Rome, and was consul suffectus a second time, probably in 76.
- Gaius Pompeius Longus Gallus, consul in AD 49.
- Pompeius Paulinus, consul suffectus about AD 54, and subsequently one of the Roman commanders in Germania during the reign of Nero. In 58, he helped complete a dam to restrain the flooding of the Rhine. In 62, he was appointed one of the superintendents of the public revenue. He was probably the father-in-law of Seneca the Younger.
- Pompeius Aelianus, a youthful ex-quaestor, who was exiled from Italy and Spain in AD 61 for participating in the conspiracy of Valerius Fabianus, who planned to acquire the fortune of the elderly Domitius Balbus using a forged will.
- Pompeia Paulina, the wife of Seneca the Younger, to whom she was deeply devoted. When Seneca received word from the emperor that he was to kill himself, Pompeia opened her veins over her husband's objections, that they might die together. Wishing to avoid the appearance of cruelty, Nero ordered that her life be preserved, and she lived some years thereafter.
- Pompeius Longinus, a tribune in the Praetorian Guard, was removed from his position by the emperor Nero, during the suppression of the Pisonian conspiracy in AD 65. Four years later, he had regained his rank, and is mentioned by Tacitus among the friends of Galba, at the time when many of the Praetorian soldiers were going over to Otho.
- Pompeius Propinquus, procurator of Gallia Belgica at the time of Nero's death, in AD 68. When Vitellius was proclaimed emperor in the following year, Pompeius was slain by his own soldiers.
- Lucius Pompeius Vopiscus, (Note: Or perhaps Lucius Poppaeus Vopiscus.) consul suffectus in AD 69.
- Gnaeus Pompeius Collega, consul suffectus in November and December of AD 71.
- Lucius Pompeius Vopiscus Gaius Arruntius Catellius Celer, consul suffectus in AD 77.
- Quintus Pompeius Trio, consul suffectus, probably in July and August, AD 80. (Note: Gallivan indicates a gap between the consulship of Lucius Aelius Plautius Lamia Aelianus and Gaius Marius Marcellus Octavius Publius Cluvius Rufus, which expired at the end of June, 80, and that of Marcus Titius Frugi and Titus Vinicius Julianus, consuls in November and December of the same year. The Fasti Septempeda inserts three consuls between these pairs: Quintus Pompeius Trio, Sextus Neranius Capito, and Lucius Acilius Strabo. Trio would therefore seem to have been consul in July and August, either with Sextus Neranius Capito, or with a colleague whose name has been omitted from the Fasti.)
- Marcus Larcius Magnus Pompeius Silo, consul suffectus in AD 82.
- Pompeia Celerina, the mother-in-law of Pliny the Younger.
- Pompeius Saturninus, a rhetorician and acquaintance of Pliny the Younger, who mentions his historical and poetic writing.
- Gnaeus Pinarius Aemilius Cicatricula Pompeius Longinus, consul suffectus in AD 90.
- Gnaeus Pompeius Catullinus, consul suffectus in AD 90.
- Sextus Pompeius (Cn. f.) Collega, consul in AD 93 and son of the consul of 71.
- Gnaeus Pompeius Ferox Licinianus, consul suffectus in AD 98.
- Gaius Pompeius Planta, governor of Egypt from AD 98 to 100.
- Lucius Pompeius, possibly the father of the empress Pompeia Plotina.
- Pompeia L. f. Plotina, the wife of Trajan, and Roman empress. She encouraged her husband to adopt Hadrian, as she had no children of her own, and was honoured by the latter emperor after her death. According to most accounts, she was a woman of exemplary virtue, although Cassius Dio reports an unsavoury rumour concerning the nature of her relationship to Hadrian.
- Pomepia L. f. Marullina, the wife or mother of a consul from Nemausus in Gallia Narbonensis. She was probably a relative of the empress Plotina as well as her adopted son Hadrian. Historian Christian Settipani speculated that they may have been sisters.
- Servius Cornelius Ser. f. P. n. Dolabella Metilianus Pompeius Marcellus, consul suffectus in AD 113.
- Aulus Pompeius Vopiscus, legate in Thracia during the reign of Antoninus Pius.
- Sextus Pompeius Festus, a grammarian who probably flourished during the later second century. His chief work is an epitome of De Significatu Verborum of Marcus Verrius Flaccus, a grammarian in the time of Augustus, whose work has been lost. To Flaccus' original text, Festus has added his own comments, observations, and ideas.
- Pompeius Catussa, a native of Sequania in Gallia Belgica, was a tector, a maker of ornamental plastering for homes. He erected a monument to his wife, which is now in the museum at Lyon.
- Pompeius Probus, appointed consul in AD 310 by the eastern emperors Galerius and Licinius; his authority was not recognized by the western emperors, Maxentius and Constantine. His relationship to the other Pompeii is probably through the maternal line, as he appears to have been a member of the gens Petronia.
- Saint Pompeius of Pavia, Bishop of Pavia from AD 339 to 353. The circumstances of his canonization are uncertain, but he is not thought to have been a martyr. His feast day is December 14.
- Pompeius, a Latin grammarian, who must have flourished before the fifth century, as he appears to have been a source for Servius and Cassiodorus. Two of his works are extant: Commentum artis Donati, about the parts of speech, and Commentariolus in librum Donati de Barbaris et Metaplasmis, a short treatise on the development of language through the introduction of foreign words and irregular forms.
- Flavius Pompeius, nephew of the emperor Anastasius I, was consul of the east in AD 501. Despite his faithful service over many years, he and his brother, Hypatius were put to death by Justinian in 532, when in the course of the Nika Revolt, an angry mob declared Hypatius their choice to be emperor.
- Flavius Anastasius Paulus Probus Sabinianus Pompeius Anastasius, consul of the east in AD 517.

== See also ==
- Aulus Pompeius, two politicians of this name who lived during the Roman Republic.
- Quintus Pompeius, various persons of this name who lived during the Roman Republic and Empire.
- Sextus Pompeius, relatives of Pompey the Great.
- List of Roman gentes
- Pompeo, an Italian personal name and surname derived from Pompeius.

== Bibliography ==
- Marcus Tullius Cicero, Brutus, De Finibus Bonorum et Malorum, De Officiis, De Oratore, Divinatio in Quintum Caecilium, Epistulae ad Atticum, Epistulae ad Familiares, Epistulae ad Quintum Fratrem, In Verrem, Laelius de Amicitia, Philippicae, Pro Archia Poeta, Pro Balbo, Pro Fonteio, Pro Murena.
- Gaius Sallustius Crispus (Sallust), Bellum Catilinae (The Conspiracy of Catiline).
- Gaius Julius Caesar, Commentarii de Bello Gallico (Commentaries on the Gallic War), Commentarii de Bello Civili (Commentaries on the Civil War), De Bello Africo (On the African War, attributed), De Bello Hispaniensis (On the War in Spain, attributed).
- Titus Livius (Livy), History of Rome.
- Quintus Horatius Flaccus (Horace), Carmen Saeculare, Epistulae, Odes.
- Marcus Terentius Varro, Rerum Rusticarum (Rural Matters).
- Lucius Annaeus Seneca (Seneca the Elder), Suasoriae (Rhetorical Exercises).
- Strabo, Geographica.
- Publius Ovidius Naso (Ovid), Epistulae ex Ponto (Letters from Pontus).
- Marcus Velleius Paterculus, Compendium of Roman History.
- Valerius Maximus, Factorum ac Dictorum Memorabilium (Memorable Facts and Sayings).
- Lucius Annaeus Seneca (Seneca the Younger), Epistulae Morales ad Lucilium (Moral Letters to Lucilius), De Brevitate Vitae (On the Brevity of Life), Apocolocyntosis Divi Claudii (The Gourdification of the Divine Claudius).
- Quintus Asconius Pedianus, Commentarius in Oratio Ciceronis Pro Milone (Commentary on Cicero's Oration Pro Milone).
- Gaius Plinius Secundus (Pliny the Elder), Naturalis Historia (Natural History).
- Gaius Plinius Caecilius Secundus (Pliny the Younger), Epistulae (Letters), Panegyricus Trajani (Panegyric on Trajan).
- Publius Cornelius Tacitus, Annales, Historiae, De Vita et Moribus Iulii Agricolae (On the Life and Mores of Julius Agricola).
- Plutarchus, Lives of the Noble Greeks and Romans, Regum et Imperatorium Apophthegmata (Sayings of Kings and Commanders).
- Gaius Suetonius Tranquillus, De Vita Caesarum (Lives of the Caesars, or The Twelve Caesars), De Illustribus Grammaticis (On the Illustrious Grammarians).
- Appianus Alexandrinus (Appian), Bellum Civile (The Civil War), Bella Mithridatica (The Mithridatic Wars), Hispanica (The Spanish Wars).
- Marcus Junianus Justinus Frontinus (Justin), Epitome de Cn. Pompeio Trogo Historiarum Philippicarum et Totius Mundi Originum et Terrae Situs (Epitome of Trogus' Philippic History and Origin of the Whole World and all of its Lands).
- Lucius Cassius Dio Cocceianus (Cassius Dio), Roman History.
- Sextus Aurelius Victor (attributed), Epitome de Caesaribus.
- Aelius Spartianus, "The Life of Hadrian".
- Julius Capitolinus, "The Lives of Maximus and Balbinus".
- Paulus Orosius, Historiarum Adversum Paganos (History Against the Pagans).
- Joannes Zonaras, Epitome Historiarum (Epitome of History).
- Joseph Hilarius Eckhel, Doctrina Numorum Veterum (The Study of Ancient Coins, 1792–1798).
- Desiré-Raoul Rochette, Lettre à M. Schorn, Firmin Didot Frères, Paris (1832).
- Wilhelm Drumann, Geschichte Roms in seinem Übergang von der republikanischen zur monarchischen Verfassung, oder: Pompeius, Caesar, Cicero und ihre Zeitgenossen, Königsberg (1834–1844).
- Dictionary of Greek and Roman Biography and Mythology, William Smith, ed., Little, Brown and Company, Boston (1849).
- Theodor Mommsen et alii, Corpus Inscriptionum Latinarum (The Body of Latin Inscriptions, abbreviated CIL), Berlin-Brandenburgische Akademie der Wissenschaften (1853–present).
- Wilhelm Dittenberger, Sylloge Inscriptionum Graecarum (Collection of Greek Inscriptions, abbreviated SIG), Leipzig (1883).
- George Davis Chase, "The Origin of Roman Praenomina", in Harvard Studies in Classical Philology, vol. VIII (1897).
- Paul von Rohden, Elimar Klebs, & Hermann Dessau, Prosopographia Imperii Romani (The Prosopography of the Roman Empire, abbreviated PIR), Berlin (1898).
- T. Robert S. Broughton, The Magistrates of the Roman Republic, American Philological Association (1952).
- Robert K. Sherk, "The Text of the Senatus Consultum De Agro Pergameno", in Greek, Roman, and Byzantine Studies, vol. 7, pp. 361–369 (1966).
- Guido Bastianini, "Lista dei prefetti d'Egitto dal 30^{a} al 299^{p}" (List of the Prefects of Egypt from 30 BC to AD 299), in Zeitschrift für Papyrologie und Epigraphik, vol. 17 (1975).
- Ronald Syme, Some Arval Brethren, Clarendon Press, Oxford (1980) ISBN 9780198148319.
- Paul Gallivan, "The Fasti for A.D. 70–96", in Classical Quarterly, vol. 31, pp. 186–220, Cambridge University Press (1981).
- Werner Eck, Peter Weiß, "Hadrianische Konsuln Neue Zeugnisse aus Militärdiplomen" (The Consuls under Hadrian: New Evidence from Military Diplomas), in Chiron, vol. 32, p. 480 (2002).
- Anthony R. Birley, The Roman Government of Britain, Oxford University Press (2005).
