= Sosius =

Sosius can refer to:

- Sosius of Pergamum, Hellenistic artist
- Gaius Sosius, Roman politician
- Quintus Sosius Senecio, Roman politician
- Sossius (d. 305), deacon

== See also ==
- Sosia gens
