= Publius Julius Lupus =

Late 1st/early 2nd century Roman senator

Publius Julius Lupus was a Roman senator, best known as the step-father of the emperor Antoninus Pius. He was suffect consul in the nundinium of November-December 98 as the colleague of Quintus Fulvius Gillo Bittius Proculus.

Lupus was a descendant of Julius Lupus, the brother-in-law of Marcus Arrecinus Clemens, praetorian prefect of the emperor Caligula; this made him a distant relative of the Flavian dynasty. Anthony Birley suggests his origins lay in Nemausus. Lupus married Arria Fadilla, the mother of Antoninus, after the death of her first husband, Titus Aurelius Fulvus consul in 89; between them they had two daughters, Arria Lupula, and Julia Fadilla.

John Grainger, noting that nothing is known of his senatorial career beyond that he was suffect consul, observes that Lupus was likely appointed to the consulship by Nerva, but when Nerva selected Trajan to be his successor his nundinium was shortened from four to two months to accommodate a number of influential senators whose support was needed to ensure Trajan's acceptance as emperor.

Political offices
Preceded by Gaius Pomponius Rufus Acilius Priscscus Coelius Sparsus; Gnaeus Pompeius Ferox Licinianus as suffect consuls	Roman consul 98 (suffect) with Quintus Fulvius Gillo Bittius Proculus	Succeeded by Aulus Cornelius Palma Frontonianus; Quintus Sosius Senecio as ordinary consuls
