= Aulus Cornelius Palma Frontonianus =

Late 1st/early 2nd century Roman statesman, soldier, consul and governor

Aulus Cornelius Palma Frontonianus (died AD 118) was a soldier and Roman statesman who was twice consul: first as consul ordinarius in AD 99, with Quintus Sosius Senecio as his colleague; and again in 109, with Publius Calvisius Tullus Ruso as his colleague.

Cornelius Palma came from Volsinii in Etruria. His first known post is that of praetorian legate to the proconsular governor of Asia sometime during Domitian's reign. He went on to command a legion from 94 to 97 AD, and became consul in 99. That year, Cornelius Palma went to Hispania to assume the position of governor of Hispania Tarraconensis. A short time later, he became the governor of Syria, and under emperor Trajan annexed Nabatea in AD 106, helping to create the Roman province of Arabia Petraea. In AD 109, he was consul ordinarius a second time.

Cornelius Palma seems to have been valued by Trajan for his administrative and military skills. This closeness to the emperor may have been a deciding factor that led to him — along with Gnaeus Pedanius Fuscus Salinator, Avidius Nigrinus, Calpurnius Piso Licinianus, and Lusius Quietus — to be executed by Hadrian following the death of Trajan.

Political offices
Preceded by Quintus Fulvius Gillo Bittius Proculus, and Publius Julius Lupus as consules suffecti	Consul of the Roman Empire; 99 with Quintus Sosius Senecio	Succeeded by Publius Sulpicius Lucretius Barba, and Senecio Memmius Afer as consules suffecti
Preceded by Quintus Pompeius Falco, and Marcus Titius Lustricus Bruttianus as consules suffecti	Consul of the Roman Empire; 109 with Publius Calvisius Tullus Ruso	Succeeded by Lucius Annius Largus, and Publius Calvisius Tullus Ruso
