= Marcus Titius Lustricus Bruttianus =

Early 2nd century Roman senator, consul and general

Marcus Titius Lustricus Bruttianus was a Roman senator and general of the early 2nd century AD. He was suffect consul in the nundinium of September to December 108 as the colleague of Quintus Pompeius Falco. Until the discovery of an inscription bearing a list of the offices he held, all that was known about him was the year of his consulate and an anecdote forming the subject of one of Pliny the Younger's letters.

== Career ==
His cursus honorum is known from an inscription found between 2011 and 2014 at Vasio (modern Vaison-la-Romaine) in the Roman province of Gallia Narbonensis; this has led some experts to suspect this was Bruttianus' hometown. The first office Bruttianus is known to have held was as quaestor of the public province of Achaea; this inscription also states he was military tribune for an unknown legion, but it is uncertain whether he held that commission before or after his quaestorship. Upon completion of this traditional Republican magistracy, Bruttianus would have been enrolled in the Senate. Two more of the traditional Republican magistracies followed: aedile and praetor. He is also attested as having been appointed legatus or assistant to the proconsular governor of Africa.

After stepping down from the praetorship, he was twice legatus legionis or commander of two legions. This was an unusual arrangement, and Anthony Birley was able to list only thirty-three men known to have commanded more than one legion -- which did not include Bruttianus. The first was Legio I Italica, which served in Trajan's Dacian Wars. During his command, Bruttianus demonstrated heroism which resulted in the award of dona militaria by the emperor Trajan. The second is reported to be Legio X Augustae. Bruttianus was also governor of two provinces: Achaea where he had been quaestor, and the imperial province of Cilicia.

Pliny's letter that recounts an event in Bruttianus' life has been dated around the years 106–7, which was prior to his consulate. He caught a close friend, Montanius Atticinus, engaging in criminal activity and reported it by letter to Trajan; Atticinus responded by making an accusation against Bruttianus. According to Pliny, who was a juridicus at the hearing, Bruttianus presented his will, which was written in Atticinus' handwriting, as proof that they were intimate friends, then presented clear evidence of the other's crimes, which apparently involved tampering with legal documents and the subversion of a clerk's slave. Trajan ruled against Atticinus, and banished him to an island. Pliny notes that Bruttianus' reputation for honesty was strengthened and his fame increased.

The inscription attests to a number of offices Bruttianus held after his consulate. He was general of the army in Germania Superior and Inferior, then admitted to the Septemviri epulonum, one of the four most prestigious ancient Roman priesthoods, and finally was commander of the army in Roman Judea and Roman Arabia.

Political offices
Preceded by Publius Aelius Hadrianus, and Marcus Trebatius Priscus as Ordinary consuls	Suffect consul of the Roman Empire; 108 with Quintus Pompeius Falco	Succeeded by Aulus Cornelius Palma Frontonianus II, and Publius Calvisius Tullus Ruso as Ordinary consuls
