= Syria Palaestina =

Province of the Roman Empire (135–357 CE)

Province of Syria Palaestina Provincia Syria Palaestina (Latin) Ἐπαρχία Συρίας τῆς Παλαιστίνης (Koine Greek)
- Province of the Roman Empire
- c. 135 (enlarged c. 300)–357/58
- Syria Palaestina within the Roman Empire in 210
- Capital: Caesarea Maritima
- Historical era: Roman Palestine
  - Established: c. 135 (enlarged c. 300)
  - Disestablished: 357/58
Preceded by
Judaea
Arabia Petraea
Succeeded by
Palaestina Prima
Palaestina Secunda
Palaestina Salutaris

Syria Palaestina (Koine Greek: Συρία ἡ Παλαιστίνη, romanized: Syría hē Palaistínē [syˈri.a (h)e̝ palɛsˈtine̝]) was the renamed Roman province formerly known as Judaea, possibly due to the Roman suppression of the Bar Kokhba revolt, in what was known as Palaestina (Palestine) between the early 2nd and late 4th centuries AD. The provincial capital was Caesarea Maritima. Diocletian added to it in c. 300 much of the province of Arabia Petraea. It forms part of the timeline of Roman Palestine, the term used for the Southern Levant or Palestine region while under indirect or direct Roman rule.

== Background ==
The kingdom of Herod the Great was split into a tetrarchy in 4 BC, which was gradually absorbed into Roman provinces, with the neighbouring Roman province of Syria annexing Iturea and Trachonitis. The capital of the Roman province of Judaea shifted from Jerusalem to Caesarea Maritima, which, according to historian Hayim Hillel Ben-Sasson, had been the "administrative capital" of the region beginning in 6 AD.

The Roman province of Judaea had, at its height, incorporated the historical regions of Judea (including Idumea), Samaria, Galilee, and additional parts of the former territory of the Hasmonean and Herodian kingdoms of Judea. It inherited its name and territory from Herod Archelaus's client state of Judaea, which had formed the core of the Herodian Tetrarchy, but Roman Judaea eventually encompassed a much larger territory than Herod Archelaus's dominion. The name "Judaea" ultimately traces to the Iron Age Kingdom of Judah.

Following the deposition of Herod Archelaus in 6 AD, Judaea came under direct Roman rule, during which time the Roman governor was given authority to punish by execution. The general population also began to be taxed by Rome. However, Jewish leaders retained broad discretion over affairs within Judaism.

== History ==
During the 1st and 2nd centuries, Judaea became the epicenter of a series of unsuccessful large-scale Jewish rebellions against Rome, known as the Jewish-Roman Wars. The Roman suppression of these revolts led to wide-scale destruction, a very high toll of life and enslavement. The First Jewish-Roman War (66–73) resulted in the destruction of Jerusalem and the Second Temple. Two generations later, the Bar Kokhba revolt (132–136) erupted. Judea's countryside was devastated, and many were killed, displaced or sold into slavery. Jewish presence in the region significantly dwindled after the failure of the Bar Kokhba revolt.

Following the suppression of the Bar Kokhba revolt, Jerusalem was rebuilt as a Roman colony under the name of Aelia Capitolina, and Judaea was renamed Syria Palaestina, a term occasionally used among Greco-Romans for centuries to describe the Southern Levant.^{A} Syria-Palaestina included Judea, Samaria, Galilee, Idumaea, and Philistia. The province retained its capital, Caesarea Maritima, and therefore remained distinct from Syria, which was located further north with its capital in Antioch. Jerusalem, which held special religious significance for the Jews but had been destroyed, was rebuilt as the colonia Aelia Capitolina. Jews were forbidden to settle there or in the immediate vicinity.

While Syria was divided into several smaller provinces by Septimius Severus, and later again by Diocletian, Syria Palaestina survived into late antiquity. Presumably, it was small enough not to become dangerous as a potential starting point for usurpation attempts. Instead, Diocletian even integrated parts of Arabia Petraea into the province, namely the Negev and the Sinai Peninsula. He moved the Legio X Fretensis from Aelia Capitolina to Aila (today's Eilat/Aqaba) to secure the country against Arab incursions. The part of the Roman imperial border that now ran through Palestine was subsequently placed under its own supreme commander, the dux Palaestinae, who is known from the Notitia Dignitatum. The border wall, the Limes Arabicus, which had existed for some time, was pushed further south.

Late Roman administration is also illuminated by the so-called Diocletian boundary stones, a series of several dozen inscriptions from the Golan Heights and Hula Valley marking village lands and tax jurisdictions.

The Crisis of the Third Century (235–284) affected Syria Palaestina, but the fourth century brought an economic upswing due to the Christianization of the Roman Empire and the associated upswing in Christian pilgrimage to the "Holy Land". In the course of late antiquity, with imperial support, Christianity succeeded in asserting itself against both remnants of Semitic as well as trending Hellenistic Paganism in the land.

The province was split into smaller ones during the fourth and fifth centuries. In 358, areas that had formerly belonged to Arabia Petraea were transformed into a separate province of Palaestina Salutaris with Petra as its capital. The remaining territory was named Palaestina Prima. Around the year 400, it had been further split into a smaller Palaestina Prima and Palaestina Secunda. Palaestina Prima included the heartland with the capital at Caesarea, while Palaestina Secunda extended to Galilee, the Golan, and parts of the Transjordan and its capital was Scythopolis (now Beit She'an). Salutaris was named Palaestina Tertia or Salutaris.

== Name ==
The name Syria Palaestina was introduced by the Roman authorities in the aftermath of the Bar Kokhba revolt (132–136 AD), when the province of Judaea was renamed. Most scholars interpret this renaming as a deliberate attempt by the Romans to suppress Jewish identification with the land and to erase the province's association with the Jewish people. While the Romans frequently renamed provinces for administrative or political reasons, the renaming of Judaea is widely regarded as unique, as the only known case where a province's name was changed explicitly as a punitive response to a rebellion.

The precise date and motivations behind the name change remain uncertain, though circumstantial evidence points to Emperor Hadrian's involvement. Coins issued by Hadrian before the revolt still refer to Judaea, while a military diploma from 139 AD already uses the new name. The former name carried a clear ethnic association with the Jewish people, whereas the new designation was devoid of explicit ethnic connotations. The renaming coincided with broader Roman efforts to suppress Jewish national identity, including the imposition of restrictions on Jewish religious practices, the expulsion of Jews from Jerusalem and its surrounding areas, and the refounding of the city as Aelia Capitolina.

Classicist Louis Feldman writes that the aim was to "obliterate the Jewish character of the land, with the name of the nearest tribe being applied to the entire area", writing that the term Palestina had previously referred mainly to the coastal region inhabited by the Philistines in the Iron Age and that early Roman authors typically distinguished it from Judaea; By applying the name of a neighboring people—the Philistines—to the entire region, the Roman authorities sought to symbolically sever the connection between the Jews and their ancestral homeland. Historian Ze'ev Safrai writes that the renaming was motivated by the "effort to wipe out all memory of the bond between the Jews and the land." Historian Werner Eck writes that the renaming was a deliberate and exceptional act of punishment. He rejects demographic explanations—pointing to rebellious provinces such as Germania, Pannonia, and Britannia, which retained their names despite revolts and population loss—and emphasizes that Judaea alone lost its ethnically derived name as a symbolic measure to punish the Jews and sever their connection to the land.

Alongside the dominating explanation of the renaming as a punishment, there are also other theories. David Jacobson suggests that the renaming may have been a practical choice, intended to reflect that the Roman province encompassed a much larger area than the traditional district of Judea, and to draw on a name with ancient regional associations. He also notes that the name was historically linked to the broader region of greater Israel. The name Syria-Palaestina was already in use in the Greco-Roman world at least five centuries earlier. Herodotus, for example, used the term in the 5th century BC when discussing the component parts of the fifth province of the Achaemenid Empire: Phoenicia, Cyprus, "and that part of Syria which is called Palestine". Historian Seth Schwartz writes that the name was intended to "celebrate the de-Judaization of the province." Historian Ronald Syme suggested the name change preceded the revolt, possibly reflecting "Hadrian's decided opinions about Jews."

Some authors in late antiquity, such as Galen, Celsus, Dio Cassius, Origen, Eusebius and Jerome continued to refer to Judaea out of habit due to the prominent association with the Jews. This includes an inscription from Ephesos from AD 170–180, honoring the wife of a figure known as "Eroelius Klaros", who had the epithet "ruler of Judaea" ("[Ερο]υκίου Κλάρου, υπάτου, [ηγ]εμόνος Ιουδ[αίας]"), decades after the recreation of Provincia Judaea as Syria-Palaestina. Modern scholars also sometimes continue to use Judaea to refer to the province after its renaming. Fergus Millar, for example, refers to events occurring in the "province now known as Syria Palaestina, which we call more naturally Judaea".

Despite this "Syria" in the name, Palestine was independent of Roman Syria, even to a greater extent than before, since instead of a legatus Augusti pro praetore, a higher-ranking governor of consular rank now presided over the region. This in turn was probably due to the fact that in addition to the already existing legion in Caesarea, a second legion was stationed in Legio, increasing the military importance of the province. Exactly when the legion was moved and the rank of the governor's post increased is a matter of debate – in any case, these events must have occurred before the governorship of Quintus Tineius Rufus, who took office no later than 130.

== Demographics ==
The population of Syria-Palaestina was of mixed character.

=== Jews ===
The aftermath of the Bar Kokhba revolt resulted in severe devastation for Judaea's Jewish population, including significant loss of life, forced displacements, and widespread enslavement. The scale of suffering was immense, with ancient sources reporting extensive destruction and high casualty rates. It appears that at the end of the revolt, Jewish settlement in Judaea Proper had nearly been eradicated, but remained strong in other parts of Palestine. Jewish survivors faced harsh Roman punitive measures, including expulsion from Jerusalem and other areas, leading to a migration to Galilee and Golan. Some scholars suggest that a number of Jews may have forfeited their Jewish identity and assimilated into the Pagan and early Christian I.e. Gentile populations. Many Jewish captives were sold into slavery across the Roman Empire, contributing to an increase in the Jewish diaspora.

Historian Moshe David Herr writes that in the aftermath of the Bar Kokhba revolt, the Jewish share of the population in Palestine declined from about two-thirds to around three-fifths or less, a figure that continued to decrease during the subsequent Amoraic period. Economic hardship and political instability led to increased emigration, particularly to Babylonia. In the early 3rd century AD, Rabbi Yohanan, a prominent sage, observed that "most of the Land of Israel is in the hands of Jews"; however, not long afterward, his disciple Rabbi Eleazar ben Pedat noted that "most of the Land of Israel is now in the hands of gentiles." The change is also reflected in a statement attributed to Rabbi Joshua ben Levi (first half of the 3rd century AD), who, after seeing grapes of extraordinary size growing in a field not owned by Jews, remarked: "O earth, O earth! Gather in your fruit. For whom do you produce your fruit? For these gentiles who stand over us in our sins?" Another version of the same passage uses "Arabs" instead of "gentiles" and is therefore cited as evidence for the migration of neighboring populations into formerly Jewish-dominated areas. Herr estimates that by the end of the 4th century, Jews made up only about one-third of the population of Palestine.

=== Pagans ===
According to Eitan Klein, after the revolt, Roman authorities confiscated lands in Judaea, leading to the resettlement of the region by a diverse population. Archaeological evidence shows that gentile migrants from neighboring Levantine provinces such as Arabia, Syria, and Phoenicia, as well as from the coastal plain and beyond, settled in the area. The new Roman colony of Aelia Capitolina was populated by Roman veterans and migrants from western parts of the empire, who also occupied its surroundings, administrative centers, and main roads. According to Lichtenberger, archaeological evidence from Bayt Nattif suggests a persistence of non-conformist unorthodox Jewish groups that did not adhere to strict Biblical monotheism, as well as remnants of semitic pagan groups related to those of Yahwahist Iron Age Judah in the late Roman period.

In AD 300, Jews formed around a quarter of the population and lived in compact settlements in Galilee, while Samaritans were concentrated in Samaria. By the fifth century, Christianity had gained further ground in the region, and Christians formed a majority in Palestine and Jerusalem through migration and conversion of pagans, Samaritans and Jews.

== Religion ==
=== Roman Imperial cult ===
After the Jewish–Roman wars (66–135), which Epiphanius believed the Cenacle survived, the significance of Jerusalem to Christians entered a period of decline, it having been destroyed and later refounded as the pagan colonia of Aelia Capitolina. Christian interest resumed again with the pilgrimage of Empress Helena, the mother of Constantine the Great, c. 326–28.

New pagan cities were founded in Judea at Eleutheropolis (now Bayt Jibrin), Diopolis (now Lod), and Nicopolis.

The Hellenization of Palaestina continued under Septimius Severus (193–211 AD).

=== Early Christianity ===
The Romans destroyed Jerusalem, leading to a new diaspora. Traditionally it is believed the Jerusalem Christians waited out the Jewish–Roman wars in Pella in the Decapolis.

The line of Jewish bishops in Jerusalem, which is claimed to have started with James, brother of Jesus as its first bishop, ceased to exist within the Empire. Hans Küng in Islam: Past Present and Future, suggests that the Jewish Christians sought refuge in the Arabian Peninsula and he quotes with approval Clemen et al., "This produces the paradox of truly historic significance that while Jewish Christianity was swallowed up in the Christian church, it preserved itself in Islam."

== Reorganization ==
In circa 390, Syria Palaestina was reorganised into several administrative units: Palaestina Prima, Palaestina Secunda, and Palaestina Salutaris (in the 6th century), Syria Prima and Phoenice and Phoenice Lebanensis. All were included within the larger Eastern Roman (Byzantine) Diocese of the East, together with the provinces of Isauria, Cilicia, Cyprus (until 536), Euphratensis, Mesopotamia, Osroene, and Arabia Petraea.

Palaestina Prima consisted of Judaea, Samaria, Peraea and Caesarea as administrative centre. Palaestina Secunda consisted of Galilee, the Decapolis and Scythopolis as the seat of government. Palaestina Tertia included the Negev, southern Transjordan part of Arabia, and most of Sinai, with Petra as the usual residence of the governor. Palaestina Tertia was also known as Palaestina Salutaris.

== Governors ==
This list is incomplete. The fasti of Syria Palaestina are "meager" and "almost no third century governors" are known.

At first the governors were consular legates, as in the preceding Roman administration of Judaea. After 196, their rank varied. During the reign of Diocletian (286–305) they ceased to be legates of senatorial rank and became praesides of equestrian rank.

- Publius Calpurnius Atilianus (139)
- Domitius Seneca (142)
- Decimus Velius Fidus (150)
- Decimus Seius Seneca (157)
- Gaius Julius Severus (158), son of Gaius Julius Severus
- Maximus Lucilianus (160)
- Gaius Julius Commodus Orfitianus (161–163)
- Flavius Boethus (162/166–168/170)
- Erucius Clarus (170–180)
- Julius Lepidianus (186)
- Marcus Ulpius Arabianus (in or before 196)
- Marucs Junius Maximus (198/212, probably 198–199)
- Gaius Julius Titianus (213/222)
- Lucius Valerius Valerianus, during the reign of either Caracalla (198–217) or Elagabalus (218–222)
- Aurelius Maro, acting governor (agens vice praesidis) during the reign of Gordian III (238–244) or perhaps later (260–282)
- Achaeus (c. 260)
- Arbaeus Africanus, during the joint reign of Maximian and Diocletian (286–305)
- Aufidius Priscus (293/305)
- Aelius Flavianus (303)
- Urbanus (304–307)
- Valerius Firmilianus (308/9–310/11)
- Severus? (310)
- Valentinianus (310/311)

== See also ==
- Roman Palestine
- Aelia Capitolina
- Shaam

== Sources ==
- Barnes, Timothy David (1982). The New Empire of Diocletian and Constantine. Harvard University Press. ISBN 978-0-674-28066-3.
- Belayche, Nicole (2001). "Ways of Romanization from 135 onwards". Iudaea-Palaestina: The Pagan Cults in Roman Palestine (Second to Fourth Century). Religion der Römischen Provinzen 1. Tübingen: Mohr Siebeck. p. 51. ISBN 978-3-16-147153-7.
- Davenport, Caillan (2010). "The building inscription from the fort at Udruh and Aelius Flavianus, tetrarchic praeses of Palaestina". Journal of Roman Archaeology. 23: 349-357. doi:10.1017/S1047759400002440. ISSN 1047-7594.
- Eck, Werner (1999). "The Bar Kokhba Revolt: The Roman Point of View". The Journal of Roman Studies. 89. Society for the Promotion of Roman Studies: 76–89. doi:10.2307/300735. JSTOR 300735.
- Eshel, Hanan (2006). "The Bar Kochba Revolt, 132–135". In Katz, Steven T. (ed.). The Late Roman-Rabbinic Period. The Cambridge History of Judaism. Vol. 4. Cambridge University Press. pp. 105–127. ISBN 978-0-521-77248-8.
- Feldman, Louis H. (1990). "Some Observations on the Name of Palestine". Hebrew Union College Annual. 61. Hebrew Union College – Jewish Institute of Religion: 1–23. JSTOR 23508170.
- Feldman, Louis H. (1996) [First published 1990]. "Some Observations on the Name of Palestine". Studies in Hellenistic Judaism. Leiden: Brill. pp. 553–576. ISBN 978-90-04-10418-1.
- Herr, Moshe David (2022). "The Land of Israel in Late Antiquity (324–640): A General Introduction". In Patrich, Joseph; Limor, Ora; Newman, Hillel (eds.). Eretz Israel in Late Antiquity: Introductions and Studies (in Hebrew). Vol. 1. Ben Zvi Institute. pp. 19–78. ISBN 978-965-217-444-4.
- Millar, Fergus (1987). "Empire, Community and Culture in the Roman near East: Greeks, Syrians, Jews and Arabs". Journal of Jewish Studies. 38 (2): 147. doi:10.18647/1337/JJS-1987.
- Isaac, Benjamin (22 December 2015). "Judaea-Palaestina". Oxford Research Encyclopedia of Classics. Oxford University Press. doi:10.1093/acrefore/9780199381135.013.3500. ISBN 978-0-19-938113-5.
- Jacobson, David (2001), "When Palestine Meant Israel", Biblical Archaeology Review, 27 (3), archived from the original on 25 July 2011
- Lehmann, Clayton Miles (1983). "Another Inscribed Column from Caesarea Maritima". Zeitschrift für Papyrologie und Epigraphik. 51: 191–195. JSTOR 20183829.
- Magness, Jodi (2012). The Archaeology of the Holy Land: From the Destruction of Solomon's Temple to the Muslim Conquest. Cambridge University Press. ISBN 978-1-139-01383-3.
- Millar, Fergus (2001). The Roman Near East, 31 BC–AD 337. Cambridge, Massachusetts: Harvard University Press. pp. 107–108. ISBN 978-0-674-77886-3. "The revolt thus left Judaea as a major, and on the surface a highly Romanised, element in the structure of the Empire... A diploma of 139 shows that there were then at least three cavalry alae and twelve cohortes in the province. No other province with no external frontier had so large a garrison. But what the diploma of 139 also shows is that the name 'Iudaea', with its ethnic reference, had already disappeared, to be replaced by a new name, 'Syria Palaestina'."
- Safrai, Shmuel (1976). "The Era of the Mishnah and Talmud (70–640)". In Ben-Sasson, H.H. (ed.). A History of the Jewish People. Harvard University Press. pp. 307–382. ISBN 0-674-39730-4.
- Smallwood, E. Mary (2001) [1976]. The Jews Under Roman Rule: From Pompey to Diocletian: A Study in Political Relations. Brill.
- Syme, Ronald (1962). "The Wrong Marcius Turbo". The Journal of Roman Studies. 52 (1–2): 87–96. doi:10.2307/297879. ISSN 0075-4358. JSTOR 297879. S2CID 154240558.
- Schwartz, Seth (2016). "The Impact of the Jewish Rebellions, 66–135 CE: Destruction or Provincialization?". In Collins, John J.; Manning, J.G. (eds.). Revolt and Resistance in the Ancient Classical World and the Near East. Culture and History of the Ancient Near East. Vol. 85. Brill. pp. 234–252. doi:10.1163/9789004330184_016. ISBN 978-90-04-33018-4.
