= Cassius Apronianus =

2nd century Roman senator and provincial governor

Cassius Apronianus was a Roman senator who lived in the 2nd century. It has been conjectured that he supposedly married the daughter of the Greek historian, orator, and philosopher Dio Chrysostom. Their son was the historian, consul and senator Cassius Dio.

Apronianus was originally from Bithynia (modern northwestern Turkey). He was governor of Lycia et Pamphylia around 179/180, then of Cilicia (modern southeastern Turkey) c. 180 – c. 183, where he was joined by his son Dio. Apronianus became suffect consul most likely around 185, after which he served as governor of Dalmatia (modern Dalmatia, Croatia).

== Sources ==
- Chisholm, Hugh, ed. (1911). "Dio Cassius" . Encyclopædia Britannica. Vol. 8 (11th ed.). Cambridge University Press. pp. 278–279.

Political offices
Preceded by Lucius Cossonius Eggius Marullus, and Gnaeus Papirius Aelianus as ordinary consuls	Suffect consul of the Roman Empire; 184 with Gaius Octavius Vindex	Succeeded by Triarius Maternus, and Tiberius Claudius Marcus Appius Atilius Bradua Regillus Atticus as ordinary consuls
