= Euryclids =

The Euryclids (Latin: Euryclidae) were a prominent Spartan family holding important offices starting in the 1st century BC.

== History ==
The founder of the family was Gaius Julius Eurycles, the son of Lachares. Eurycles was a Spartan commander who obtained Roman citizenship and office, with the title of "Λακεδαιμονίων ηγεμών" ("ruler of the Lacedaemonians") and the position of dynast in Sparta. Eurycles' coins start in the period 31-27 BC. His son Gaius Julius Laco was duumvir quinquennalis and Isthmian agonothete, as was Laco's son Gaius Julius Spartiaticus; both were members of the Roman equestrian order. Eurycles also probably adopted (Gaius Julius) Deximachos c. 18-12 BC (P. Memmia), who is thought to have assumed the name Gaius Julius Eurycles Herculanus. With Gaius Julius Eurycles Herculanus Lucius Vibullius Pius, the first Spartan senator, under Trajan and Hadrian, the family entered the Roman Senate. Herculanus might have had no issue, and one of his heirs was Quintus Pompeius Falco (Quintus Roscius Coelius Murena Silius Decianus Vibullius Pius Julius Eurycles Herculanus Pompeius Falco), who carried the family names forward.

== Sources ==
- Atkinson, Kathleen Mary Tyrer Chrimes. Ancient Sparta: a re-examination of the evidence. Manchester University Press ND, 1949 ()
- Birley, Anthony R.. "Hadrian and Greek Senators", Zeitschrift für Papyrologie und Epigraphik 116 (1997) 209–245 ()
- (in French) Fougères, Gustave. "Inscriptions de Mantinée", Bulletin de Correspondance Hellénique. 20 (1896) pp. 119-166. ()
- Gill, David W. J. In Search of the Social Elite in the Corinthian Church. In: Tyndale Bulletin 44.2 (1993) 323-337.
- Grier, Elizabeth. Certain Rich Men of the Second Century after Christ. Classical Association of the Atlantic States, 1930 ()
- Lindsay, Hugh. Augustus and Eurycles. ()
- Spawforth, Antony J. S. Roman Corinth: The Formation of a Colonial Elite. ()
- Zoumbaki, Sophia B. The Composition of the Peloponnesian Elites in the Roman period and the Evolution of their Resistance and Approach to the Roman Rulers. ()
