= Aulus Caecilius Faustinus =

Late 1st/early 2nd century Roman senator, consul and governor

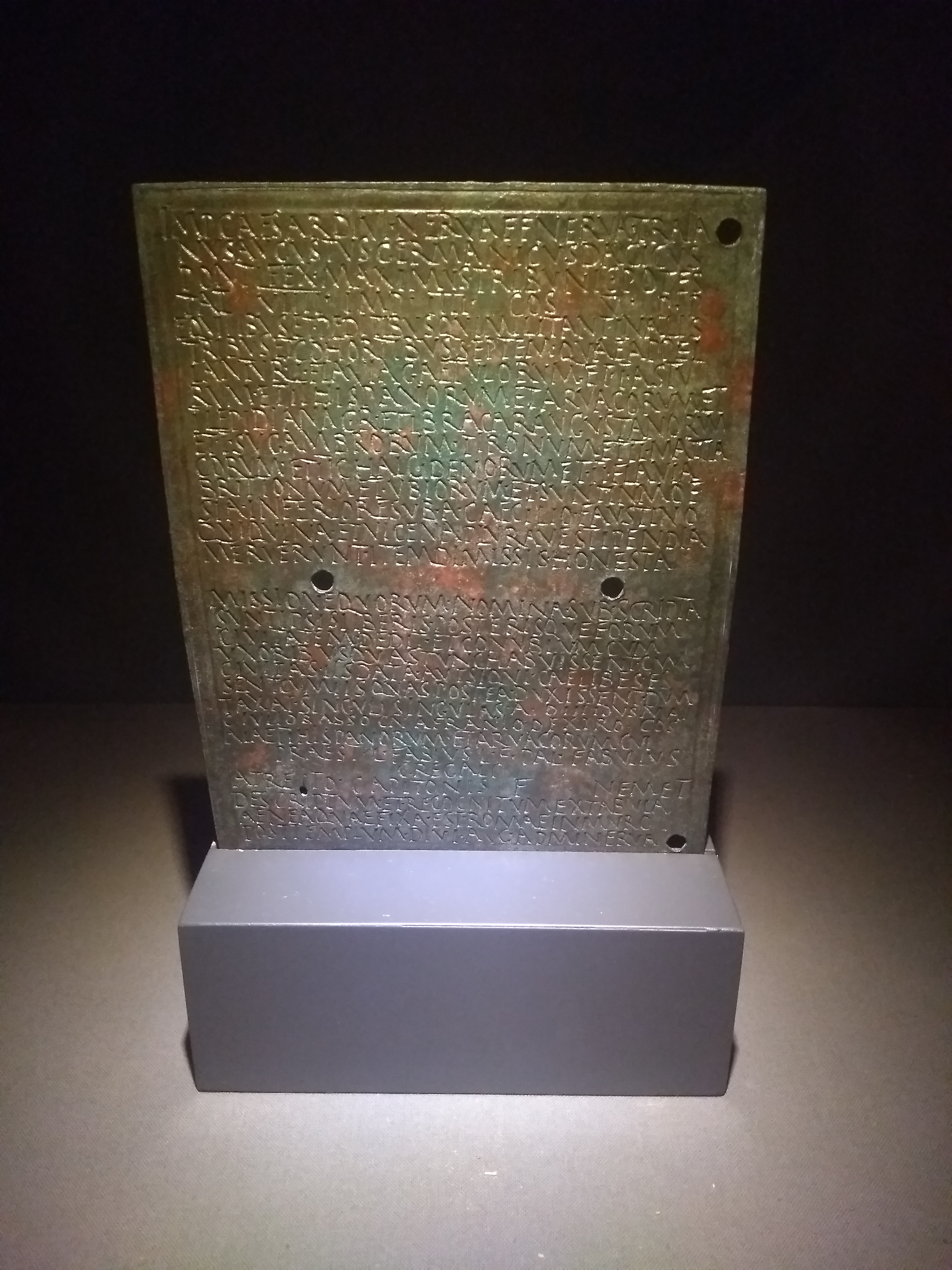
- Military diploma AE 2004, 1256, dated May 13th 105, attesting him as governor

suffect consul

Aulus Caecilius Faustinus was a Roman senator active during the reign of Trajan. He was suffect consul for the nundinium starting in August AD 99 as the colleague of Quintus Fabius Barbarus Valerius Magnus Julianus. Faustinus is known primarily from inscriptions.

The cursus honorum of Faustinus is incomplete; only two of the offices he held are documented, both after he was consul. The first was as governor of Moesia Inferior, which he held from 103 to 105, when Trajan's Second Dacian War broke out. Faustinus was immediately replaced as governor by Lucius Fabius Justus, who is known to have had more military experience.

The second office Faustinus is recorded as having held was proconsular governor of Africa in 115/116, a position considered the pinnacle of a successful senatorial career. His life after he left the province is unknown.

== See also ==
- Caecilia gens

Political offices
Preceded by Publius Sulpicius Lucretius Barba; Senecio Memmius Afer as suffecti	Roman consul 99 (suffect) with Quintus Fabius Barbarus Valerius Magnus Julianus	Succeeded by Tiberius Julius Ferox, and ignotus as suffecti
