= Triarius Maternus =

Late 2nd century Roman politician

Triarius Maternus, otherwise known as Triarius Maternus Lascivius was a Roman Senator who was consul ordinarius in 185 CE with Atticus Bradua as his colleague.

== Life ==
Triarius Maternus was a member of a noble family whose members achieved the consulate throughout the Antonine era. It is surmised that he was the son of Aulus Junius Rufinus (consul ordinarius in 153) and a Pomponia whose father was Quintus Pomponius Maternus (suffect consul in 128). His praenomen is unknown while his agnomen Lascivius is only attested in the Historia Augusta, and may be a fictional addition by the author based upon the events of 193 CE. Prior to his consulate in 185, he was attested as a iuridicus of Asturia.

Triarius Maternus was eventually caught up in the aftermath of the assassination of the emperor Commodus and the accession of Pertinax. According to the Historia Augusta, the Praetorian Guard, unhappy with the elevation of Pertinax, tried to bring Triarius to their camp on January 3, 193, and proclaim him emperor in place of Pertinax. Triarius managed to get away from them, although losing his clothes in the process, and fled to Pertinax. Pertinax then allowed him to leave the city unharmed. It has been hypothesised that Triarius's bid for the imperial throne was engineered by his nephew, the consul in 193, Gaius Julius Erucius Clarus Vibianus, who was possibly involved in the conspiracy to murder Commodus.

Triarius was married to a Procula (most likely Egnatia Procula), and his son was almost certainly Aulus Triarius Rufinus, the consul ordinarius in 210 CE.

== Sources ==
- Champlin, Edward, Notes on the Heirs of Commodus, The American Journal of Philology, Vol. 100, No. 2 (Summer, 1979), pp. 288-306 (http://www.jstor.org/stable/293693)

Political offices
Preceded by Gaius Octavius Vindex, and Cassius Apronianus as suffect consuls	Consul of the Roman Empire; 185 with Tiberius Claudius Marcus Appius Atilius Bradua Regillus Atticus	Succeeded by Imp. Caesar M. Aurelius Commodus Antoninus Augustus V, and Manius Acilius Glabrio II as ordinary consuls
