= Atticus Bradua =

2nd-century Roman senator and consul

Tiberius Claudius Marcus Appius Atilius Bradua Regillus Atticus, otherwise known as Atticus Bradua (around 145-after 209), was a Roman politician of Athenian and Italian descent who was consul ordinarius in 185 AD.

== Ancestry and family ==
Atticus Bradua was born to a wealthy family of consular rank. He was the second son of the consul and sophist Herodes Atticus of Athens and the Roman Aspasia Annia Regilla. His paternal grandparents were the consular Tiberius Claudius Atticus Herodes and the wealthy heiress Vibullia Alcia Agrippina, while his maternal grandparents were the consul Appius Annius Trebonius Gallus and Atilia Caucidia Tertulla. Through his maternal grandfather, Atticus Bradua was a relative of the empresses Faustina the Elder and Faustina the Younger, the wives of Antoninus Pius and Marcus Aurelius respectively.

== Life ==
While the place of birth of Atticus Bradua is not known, he was raised in Greece. As a child, he could not learn how to read. His father purchased twenty-four slave boys to whom he gave names beginning with the letters of the alphabet to help Bradua learn his letters. According to an inscription, there is a possibility that Bradua was sent to Sparta by his father to become an ephebe (citizen-cadet).

The parents of Bradua erected the great outdoor nymphaeum (a monumental fountain) at Olympia. The monumental fountain features statues of the ruling imperial family, alongside the family of Herodes and Regilla. Among the statues was one of Bradua which is on display at the Archaeological Museum of Olympia.

Bradua was about 15 years old when his mother died. His maternal uncle claimed that his father murdered her. Herodes Atticus saw Bradua as a disappointment. Herodes Atticus outlived most of his family and Bradua became his only surviving child, but relations between the two remained poor. When Herodes Atticus died in 177, he left nothing to Atticus Bradua. The Athenians considered Herodes Atticus's treatment towards Bradua inhumane.

== Wealth, political career and benefactions ==
After the death of his mother, Atticus Bradua inherited the estate that his mother owned with his father on the Appian Way. Atticus Bradua was considered by others as more competent than Herodes Atticus, probably due to his status and wealth. At some point during the reign of Antoninus Pius (138–161), the Emperor promoted Atticus Bradua to Patrician rank.

Atticus Bradua served as an ordinary consul in 185 and became an archon of Athens in 187/188. Sometime after his consulship, he served as proconsul of a Roman province.

Atticus Bradua followed in the footsteps of his parents as a benefactor, but not on such a lavish scale, as his fortune was much smaller than his father's. He contributed a gift to Piraeus which was commemorated, and in 209, Bradua served as herald of the Council and People of Athens.

An inscription found on a grey limestone dated after 185 at the Curia at Leptis Magna (the capital of the Africa Province) is possibly dedicated to Atticus Bradua. This inscription shows that Atticus Bradua may have served as a proconsul of Africa, could have served as a local patron and may have changed his name to honor the memory of his family, mother and maternal ancestry, and to express discontent with his father. The inscription reads:

To Marcus Atilius Metilius Bradua Caucidius Tertullus Claudius Atticus Vibullius Pollio Gauidius Latiaris Atrius Bassus, proconsul; Decimus Junius Crescens, Decimus Junius Galba, Quintus Calpurnius Capito, Lucius Plautius Octavianus to their patron.

== Sources ==
- Graindor, P., Un milliardaire antique, Ayers Company Publishers, 1979
- Wilson, N.G., Encyclopedia of Ancient Greece, Routledge, 2006
- Pomeroy, S.B., The murder of Regilla: a case of domestic violence in antiquity, Harvard University Press, 2007
- https://web.archive.org/web/20110716083759/http://www.sleepinbuff.com/13history.pdf

Political offices
| Preceded by Gaius Octavius Vindex, and Cassius Apronianus as suffect consuls | Consul of the Roman Empire; 185 with Triarius Maternus, followed by Marcus Valerius Maximianus | Succeeded by Imp. Caesar M. Aurelius Commodus Antoninus Augustus V, and Manius Acilius Glabrio II as ordinary consuls |
