= Pompeo =

Pompeo is both a masculine Italian given name and a surname, derived from the Roman "Pompeius". Notable people with the name include:

== Given name ==
- Pompeo Aldrovandi (1668–1752), Italian Cardinal of the Roman Catholic Church
- Pompeo Aldrovandini (1677–1735), Italian painter of the Baroque period
- Pompeo Batoni (1708–1787), Italian painter
- Pompeo Cannicciari (1670–1744), Italian composer
- Pompeo Colonna (1479–1532), Italian cardinal, politician and condottiero
- Pompeo Coppini (1870–1957), Italian sculptor who emigrated to the United States
- Pompeo D'Ambrosio (1917–1998), Italian who became a Venezuelan businessman
- Pompeo della Cesa (1537–1610), Italian armourer
- Pompeo Ghitti (1631–1703), Italian painter of the Baroque period
- Pompeo Landulfo (1515–1590), Italian painter of the Renaissance period
- Pompeo Marchesi (1783–1858), Lombard sculptor of the neoclassical school
- Pompeo Posar (1921–2004), Playboy magazine staff photographer
- Pompeo Targone (1575 – c. 1630), Italian military engineer

== Surname ==
- Christophe Di Pompeo (born 1964), French politician
- Ellen Pompeo (born 1969), American actress, plays Meredith Grey on the ABC medical drama Grey's Anatomy
- Mike Pompeo (born 1963), former U.S. Secretary of State, former Director of Central Intelligence Agency, former U.S. Representative for Kansas's 4th congressional district
- Isadora Pompeo (born 1999), Brazilian vlogger, singer and composer of Christian music

== Other ==
- The Last Days of Pompeo, a 1937 Italian comedy film directed by Mario Mattoli
- Il Pompeo, a dramma per musica in 3 acts by Italian composer Alessandro Scarlatti
- Pompeo Magno (Pompeius Magnus) is an opera in three acts by Venetian composer Francesco Cavalli
