= Senecio Memmius Afer =

Late 1st century Roman senator, governor and suffect consul

Senecio Memmius Afer was a Roman senator active in the last quarter of the first century AD. He was suffect consul for the nundinium of June to July AD 99 as the colleague of Publius Sulpicius Lucretius Barba. Afer is known primarily from inscriptions.

Memmius Afer's origins are disputed. Edward Champlin believes he was "almost certainly African and perhaps from Thugga", while John Grainger suggests that his origins were in Spain. Ronald Syme, noting Afer's tribe was "Galeria", states that it is attested for only one city in North Africa, Hadrumetum, while later members of the gentilicium Memmius "tend to come from Bulla Regia or Gigthis"; on the other hand, Syme states the cognomen Afer is well-attested in Spain, while he counted eighteen instances of the gentilicium Memmius in the Spanish provinces. Afer was the father-in-law of Tiberius Catius Caesius Fronto, the son of the poet Silius Italicus. Two inscriptions, one from Tibur, the other from North Africa, name his son, Lucius Memmius Tuscillus Senecio; the North African inscription describes Afer as pronepoti and Senecio as nepoti, indicating that the family continued for two more generations.

His cursus honorum is known only from the Tibur inscription, which has preserved only two of the offices Memmius Afer held. The first on the list is the imperial province of Gallia Aquitania; Werner Eck dated his tenure as governor from 94 to 96. Next he was proconsular governor of Sicily, which Eck dated to the years 97/98. However, Paul Leunissen notes that the order of these two offices is not certain, so it is possible his governorship of Sicily may have preceded that of Aquitania.

The men selected to be consuls in the year 99 numbered more than usual, and can be considered to reflect the emperor Trajan's choices, and the factions in the Senate he looked to for support. Both the ordinary consuls, Quintus Sosius Senecio and Aulus Cornelius Palma Frontonianus, were military men, each going on to enjoy the exceptional honor of a second consulate. Of the possibly as many as ten suffect consuls for that year, five are known; of these, two are provincials, two Italians, all of them active in government; the fifth, Afer's colleague Lucretius Barba, is only a name.

Afer fades from history after his consulship.

Political offices
Preceded by Aulus Cornelius Palma Frontonianus, and Quintus Sosius Senecio as consules ordinarii	Suffect consul of the Roman Empire; 99 with Publius Sulpicius Lucretius Barba	Succeeded by Quintus Fabius Barbarus Valerius Magnus Julianus, and Aulus Caecilius Faustinus as consules suffecti
