= Quintus Pompeius Sosius Falco =

Late 2nd century Roman senator and consul

Quintus Pompeius Sosius Falco (flourished 190s) was a Roman senator, who was active during the reign of Commodus. He was consul ordinarius in 193 with Gaius Julius Erucius Clarus Vibianus as his colleague.

Falco was the son of Quintus Pompeius Senecio Sosius Priscus, a patrician and consul in 149; Edward Champlin hypothesizes that his mother was Ceionia Fabia, further hypothesizing she was married to Priscus before marrying Plautius Quintillus. Falco's paternal ancestors include Sextus Julius Frontinus (consul in 73, again in 98, and a third time in 100) and Quintus Sosius Senecio, consul in 99 and again in 107.

== Life ==
The emperor Commodus had planned to murder both consuls and usurp their offices, intending a procession as sole consul and primus palus secutorum from the barracks of the gladiators. Knowledge of that plan, according to Dio Cassius, led to Commodus's assassination. The Historia Augusta reports that at the first meeting of the Senate for that year, Falco accused the emperor of participating in the crimes of Commodus; Pertinax, who was over sixty, replied: "Consul, you are a young man, and do not know the necessity of obedience." While the Historia Augusta often includes many fictitious details, William McDermott opines, "This clash has the sound of truth since pride in ancestry was strong within the young man's family."

Immediately following Commodus' death, Sosius Falco was offered the imperial throne by the Praetorian Guard, which he declined. He is known to have attempted a coup against Pertinax; however, Pertinax spared his life. His life after Pertinax's death is unknown; McDermott opines that "Sosius Falco probably retired discreetly to one of the many family estates."

== Family ==
The name of Falco's wife has come down to us: Sulpicia Agrippina, the sister of Sulpicius Justus and Pollio Sulpicius, a Senatorial family whose origins lay in Lycia and extensively documented in the inscription of Licinnia Flavilla. Sulpicia and Falco are known to have one son, Quintus Pompeius Falco Sosius Priscus, attested as praetor designatus during the reigns of either Caracalla or Elagabalus.

Political offices
Preceded by Imp. Caesar L. Aelius Aurelius Commodus Augustus VII, and Publius Helvius Pertinax II	Consul of the Roman Empire; 193 with Gaius Julius Erucius Clarus Vibianus	Succeeded by Quintus Tineius Sacerdos, and Publius Julius Scapula Priscus as suffect consuls
