= Erucia gens =

Ancient Roman family

The gens Erucia was a plebeian family at Rome. Members of this gens are first mentioned early in the first century BC; the name has been claimed as Etruscan. However, in the second century of the Empire, the Erucii attained considerable distinction.

== Praenomina used ==
The praenomina associated with the Erucii are Gaius, Marcus, and Sextus.

== Branches and cognomina ==
The only family of the Erucii known to history bore the cognomen Clarus.

== Members ==
This list includes abbreviated praenomina. For an explanation of this practice, see filiation.

- Ericius, one of Sulla's legates in the First Mithridatic War, should perhaps be read Erucius.
- Gaius Erucius, the accuser of Sextus Roscius of Ameria, whom Cicero defended in 80 BC. He was also one of the accusers of Lucius Varenus, who was likewise defended by Cicero, who calls Erucius Antoniaster, that is, an imitator of the orator Antonius.
- Gaius (Erucius) Septicius Clarus, an intimate friend of Pliny the Younger. He was appointed Praefectus Praetorio by Hadrian, but removed from this office soon afterwards, having, like most of Hadrian's other friends, incurred his suspicion.
- Marcus Erucius Clarus, brother of the Praetorian Praefect, is spoken of by Pliny as a man of honour, integrity, and learning, and well skilled in pleading causes. He is probably the same Erucius Clarus who took and burnt Seleucia, in conjunction with Tiberius Julius Alexander, in AD 115, and Marcus Erucius Clarus, consul with Alexander in AD 117, the year of Trajan's death.
- Sextus Erucius M. f. Clarus, consul in an unknown year, perhaps about AD 117, and again 146. He was a student of literature and a contemporary of Aulus Gellius, who spoke highly of him.
- Gaius Erucius (Sex. f. M. n.) Clarus, consul in AD 170, and at one time Praefectus vigilum.
- Gaius Julius Erucius (C. f. Sex. n.) Clarus, consul in AD 193. The emperor Commodus had determined to murder the consuls as they entered upon their office on the first of January, but he himself was assassinated on the preceding day. After the death of Pescennius Niger in 194, Septimius Severus wished Clarus to turn informer against Niger's supporters; but Clarus refused, and was put to death by the emperor.

== See also ==
- List of Roman gentes
