= Gaius Julius Eurycles =

Gaius Julius Eurycles or Eurycles of Sparta (born in Sparta; fl. 1st century BCE), was "hegemon of the Lacedaemonians" (Λακεδαιμονίων ἡγεμών), a benefactor of Greek cities, and founder of the family of the Euryclids.

== Life ==
Eurycles was the son of Lachares. His father was executed on charges of piracy by Marcus Antonius. Eurycles led a small naval contingent provided by Sparta to Octavian at the battle of Actium. He also outfitted his own ship from his own money. For his distinction in battle he was rewarded with Roman citizenship and the title of Λακεδαιμονίων ἡγεμών by emperor Augustus. In the late 1st century BCE, Eurycles behaved strangely and caused trouble in many Greek cities, which led to his banishing by Augustus. In the early years of Tiberius' reign, after his death, Eurycles was fully rehabilitated in Sparta.

Gaius Julius Laco was his son.

Josephus mentions a man named Eurycles (probably the same Eurycles mentioned by Tacitus referring to the Antony connection) living around 4 BC as a "vile Lacemedonean" [Spartan]. (Wars of the Jews, Book 1 Chapter 26).

Strabo (Book 8, Chapter 5) mentions that Eurycles owned the whole island of Kythira.

== Sources ==
- Zoumbaki, Sophia B. "The Composition of the Peloponnesian Elites in the Roman period and the Evolution of their Resistance and Approach to the Roman Rulers". ()
- Grier, Elizabeth. "Certain Rich Men of the 2nd century after Christ," Classical Weekly, 23, No. 15 (Feb. 24, 1930), pp. 113-115 ()
- Piper, Linda J. Spartan Twilight, Aristide D. Caratzas Publisher, 1986. ISBN 9780892413782
