= Marcus Gavius Cornelius Cethegus =

2nd century Roman senator and consul

Marcus Gavius Cornelius Cethegus was a Roman senator active during the middle of the second century AD. He was ordinary consul for 170 as the colleague of Gaius Erucius Clarus. Cethegus is best known for his behavior while travelling through Roman Greece, which provoked one person to call him a great fool, to which the philosopher Demonax replied, "Not great" (οὐδὲ μέγα).

He was the son of Marcus Gavius Squilla Gallicanus, consul in 150; a sister, Cornelia Cethegilla, has been identified. Olli Salomies, in his monograph on the naming practices of the Early Roman Empire, records a number of experts thought Cethegus and his sister were not natural, but adopted children of Gallicanus. After discussing the evidence, Salomies admits that he prefers the explanation that both "were Squilla Gallicanus' adoptive, not natural children."

Cethegus may be the boy whose initial speech before the Roman senate was the subject of a letter the orator Fronto wrote to his father, one Squilla Gallicanus. However, there is an ambiguity over the identification, because both Cethegus' father and grandfather had the same name: it is possible that the letter could have been addressed to the elder Gallicanus about his uncle Marcus Gavius Orfitus, as some have argued.

Far more definite is the fact Cethegus served as the legatus or assistant for his father when Gallicanus was proconsular governor of Asia, in the year 165. His uncle, Orfitus, was consul the same year. It was while he transversed Greece that Cethegus' behavior attracted the comment Lucian records Demonax made.

Political offices
Preceded by Quintus Pompeius Senecio Sosius Priscus, and Publius Coelius Apollinaris as ordinary consul	Consul of the Roman Empire; 170 with Gaius Erucius Clarus	Succeeded by Titus Hoenius Severus, and ignotus as suffect consul
