= Gaius Julius Erucius Clarus Vibianus =

Roman senator and consul (died 197)

Gaius Julius Erucius Clarus Vibianus (died 197 CE) was a Roman politician and senator. He was consul ordinarius with Quintus Pompeius Sosius Falco in early 193, during the reign of Pertinax.

== Life ==
Vibianus came from an Italian family or from one of the Western provinces. He was the son of Gaius Erucius Clarus, consul in 170 CE, who belonged to the powerful equestrian family of the Erucii. His paternal grandfather, Sextus Erucius Clarus, was consul in 146 CE, and before that City Prefect of Rome. His great-grandfather, who was consul suffectus in 117 CE, was the brother (or perhaps half-brother) of Gaius Septicius Clarus. His mother was Pomponia Triaria, the sister of Triarius Maternus, the consul of 185 CE.

Initially appointed to the consulate by the emperor Commodus, in the aftermath of the emperor's assassination, it was alleged by the conspirators that Commodus had planned to murder Vibianus and his colleague Falco on 1 January 193, and replace them with himself as sole consul. Possibly involved in the plot against Commodus, he may have also been involved in the aborted attempt to install his uncle Triarius Maternus as emperor on 3 January 193.

After the assassination of Pertinax, Vibianus initially survived the purges of the new emperor Septimius Severus that claimed the lives of fellow consuls Quintus Pompeius Sosius Falco and Marcus Silius Messala. However, in 197, Vibianus threw his support behind Clodius Albinus, the former Governor of Britain. With Septimius Severus's victory, the emperor approached Vibianus and asked him to be an informer against people whom Severus wanted executed. When Vibianus refused, Severus had him killed and had his memory damned.

== See also ==
- Erucia gens

== Sources ==
- PIR ², E 97
- Rudolf Hanslik, "Erucius II.3", Der Kleine Pauly, volume 2, p. 364. Stuttgart 1967
- Champlin, Edward, Notes on the Heirs of Commodus, The American Journal of Philology, Vol. 100, No. 2 (Summer, 1979), pp. 288–306 (http://www.jstor.org/stable/293693)

Political offices
Preceded by Imp. Caesar L. Aelius Aurelius Commodus Augustus VII, and Publius Helvius Pertinax II	Consul of the Roman Empire; 193 with Quintus Pompeius Sosius Falco	Succeeded by Quintus Tineius Sacerdos, and Publius Julius Scapula Priscus as suffect consuls
