= Quintus Pompeius Senecio Sosius Priscus =

Roman Senator, notable for having the longest recorded name in ancient Rome

Quintus Pompeius Senecio Sosius Priscus Quintus Pompeius Senecio Roscius Murena Coelius Sextus Iulius Frontinus Silius Decianus Gaius Iulius Eurycles Herculaneus Lucius Vibullius Pius Augustanus Alpinus Bellicius Sollers Iulius Aper Ducenius Proculus Rutilianus Rufinus Silius Valens Valerius Niger Claudius Fuscus Saxa Amyntianus Sosius Priscus (often shortened to Quintus Pompeius Senecio Sosius Priscus . . .) (fl. 2nd century) was a Roman senator who was appointed consul during the reign of Marcus Aurelius. His full name is the longest attested for any ancient Roman.

== Life ==
An outline of Sosius Priscus' career is preserved, along with his full name, in the inscription CIL XIV, 3609. It shows his career began as the Praefectus feriarum Latinarum; this was followed by a posting as triumvir monetalis. Around the year AD 162, he stood and was elected as a candidate of the emperor for the office of quaestor; being the Emperor's candidate for one of the traditional magistracies was an important distinction, reserved either for members of the Patrician order or for those close to the emperor. Upon completion of this office, the holder was qualified for admission into the Senate. Next, he was appointed legatus, serving under his father, who was the proconsular governor of the province of Asia, possibly around the year AD 163/164. As a patrician, he was allowed to skip holding either the office of aedile or plebeian tribune. Finally, Priscus was elected to the office of praetor, possibly around AD 167.

In AD 169, Sosius Priscus was elected consul ordinarius with Publius Coelius Apollinaris as his colleague. He was then appointed to the proconsular posting of praefectus alimentorum (or the officer responsible for organising Rome's food supply). This was followed by his appointment as proconsular governor of Asia at an unknown date.

A member of the College of Pontiffs, Sosius Priscus was married to Ceionia Fabia. They had at least one son, Quintus Pompeius Sosius Falco, who was appointed consul in AD 193.

== Name ==
Sosius Priscus is known for possessing the longest attested name of any ancient Roman. This was due to the practice of polyonymy, where elements of his ancestor's name were incorporated into his own. In full, his name was:

Quintus Pompeius Senecio Roscius Murena Coelius Sextus Iulius Frontinus Silius Decianus Gaius Iulius Eurycles Herculaneus Lucius Vibullius Pius Augustanus Alpinus Bellicius Sollers Iulius Aper Ducenius Proculus Rutilianus Rufinus Silius Valens Valerius Niger Claudius Fuscus Saxa Amyntianus Sosius Priscus

He received a portion of his lengthy name from his father, Quintus Pompeius Sosius Priscus, consul in AD 149, and, although the inscription that recorded his father's full name is damaged, enough of it survives to establish this:

Quintus Pompeius [...] Bellicius Sollers Iulius Acer Ducenius Proculus Rutilianus Rufinus Silius Valens Valerius Niger Claudius Fuscus Saxa Amyntianus Sosius Priscus

== Sources ==
- PIR ² P 651

Political offices
Preceded by Quintus Tullius Maximus, and ignotus as Suffect consuls	Consul of the Roman Empire; 169 with Publius Coelius Apollinaris	Succeeded by Gaius Erucius Clarus II, and Marcus Gavius Cornelius Cethegus as Ordinary consuls
