= Gaius Erucius Clarus =

Second-century Roman politician and senator

Gaius Erucius Clarus was a Roman politician and senator in the second century AD.

Gaius Erucius Clarus was a member of the plebeian gens Erucia. His father was Sextus Erucius Clarus, consul in 146 AD, and Urban Prefect. He married Pomponia Triaria, daughter of the former consul Aulus Junius Rufinus. In 170 AD, Clarus was elected consul together with Marcus Gavius Cornelius Cethegus. Later on, Clarus was appointed Governor of Syria Palestina.

His son, Gaius Julius Erucius Clarus Vibianus, served as consul in 193 AD.
