= Quintus Pompeius Falco =

2nd century Roman senator, governor and general

Quintus Pompeius Falco (c. 70 – after 140 AD) was a Roman senator and general of the early 2nd century AD. He was governor of several provinces, most notably Roman Britain, where he hosted a visit to the province by the Emperor Hadrian in the last year. Falco achieved the rank of suffect consul for the nundinium of September to December 108 with Marcus Titius Lustricus Bruttianus as his colleague.

== Name ==
His complete name was Quintus Roscius Coelius Murena Silius Decianus Vibullius Pius Julius Eurycles Herculanus Pompeius Falco, an example of polyonymy. Werner Eck has shown that Falco was the son of Sextus Pompeius Falco and Clodia P.f. Falconilla who came from Sicily, as well as identifying a brother, Quintus Pompeius Pr[iscus]. The earliest inscriptions to mention him, dated to his governorship of Lower Moesia (115-118), use the name Quintus Roscius Murena Coelius Pompeius Falco, indicating that he was adopted (condicio nominis ferendi) by another Senator in hopes of preserving his lineage. The name of this man has been disputed. Both Ronald Syme and Anthony Birley identify him as Marcus Roscius Coelius, the suffect consul of the year 81. There is also the proconsul of Bithynia and Pontus, Marcus (Roscius) Murena, his son Marcus (Roscius) Murena, and his grandson Marcus Roscius Quirnia Lupus Murena, quaestor of Creta et Cyrenaica. However, as Olli Salomies notes in his monograph on Imperial naming practices, the adoptive father would have the praenomen "Quintus", as Falco has, not "Marcus". Salomies believes his adoptive father was a Quintus Roscius, most likely from Sicily, who could be related to either of the Roscii mentioned.

The latest inscription to mention him, dated to the year 123, uses his full name. Thus between 119 and 123 he acquired the name elements "Silius Decianus Vibullius Pius Julius Eurycles Herculanus". The first two refer to a suffect consul of the year 94, Lucius Silius Decianus. The remaining elements come from the last of the Euryclids of Sparta, Gaius Julius Eurycles Herculanus, who is known to have died around 136/137; the elements "Vibullius Pius" come from another senator, Lucius Vibullius Pius, who actually adopted by testament Eurycles Herculanus. These names provide evidence for a fragment of the complex social network that Falco built up over his lifetime, which is often unknown in whole or even in part for his contemporaries.

== Life ==
=== Early life and career ===
An inscription recovered from Hierapolis ad Pyramum provides details of Falco's career in the imperial service. He started as a member of one of the four boards of the vigintiviri, the decemviri stlitibus judicandis; membership in one of these four boards was a preliminary and required first step toward gaining entry into the Roman Senate. A letter from Pliny the Younger to Falco written in 97 helps fix the date he advanced to the next magistracy, plebeian tribune, and indicates Falco was born around the year 70. While tribune, Falco at least once used his prerogative, interceding unsuccessfully for Aulus Didius Gallus Fabricius Veiento, favorite of the hated emperor Domitian and thrice consul, during the stormy session of the Senate when Pliny attacked Publicius Certus. Despite his defense of Veiento, Pliny was not offended by Falco's action, or at least not much for his later letters to Falco are cordial. McDermott dates Falco's tenure as praetor peregrinus to 99 or 100.

=== Dacian Wars, subsequent governorships ===
Birley describes Falco's career as "undistinguished" until he was put in command of the Legio V Macedonica during the First Dacian War (101-2). His actions while commanding the legion earned him dona militaria. Following the conclusion of the war, he was made governor of Lycia et Pamphylia, and then ("unusually", notes Anthony Birley) Judea; Birley speculates that the annexation of territory that became the province of Arabia Petraea "made it desirable to appoint a particularly experienced man to the adjacent province." His consulship followed not long after, which he may have held in absentia.

Upon his return to Rome, Falco became the first curator of the Via Traiana. While admitting that this was not a post of major importance, especially for a consular whose earlier and later appointments were so notable, McDermott notes Trajan's concern for roads and other infrastructure, and that the existing Via Appia, which ran through the Pomptine Marshes, was inadequate for traffic. Thus "his charge was really to build the road" and work was completed by the year 112. After a few years without employment, Falco served as governor of Moesia Inferior, where he is attested in 116 and 117. His appointment to govern Britain came soon after; Birley opines that it "must have been one of Hadrian's first acts."

=== Suppressing rebels in Britain ===
The Historia Augusta reports that when Hadrian became emperor, he was confronted with a series of rebellions across the empire, which included Britain where "the Britons could not be kept under Roman control". Sheppard Frere puts the Brigantes at the center of the rebellion in Britain, who had close ties to the Selgovae and the Novantae, in southern Caledonia. Frere notes we lack many of the details of this insurrection, but an inscription from Jarrow and commemorative coins issued in 119 attest to Falco's supposed success in crushing the revolt. A reference by the orator Fronto to many soldiers being killed in Britannia under Hadrian's rule has been suggested as indicating that the victory was hard-won. However, Fronto may have been referring to a different conflict.

=== Governor of Asia ===
In 122 Hadrian visited the island of Britain, and decreed numerous reforms for the province, which included the construction of the fortifications known as Hadrian's Wall. To implement them, however, the emperor replaced Falco with Aulus Platorius Nepos, and returned to Rome. Although he arrived in Rome too late to participate in the sortition for proconsular governorship for that year, the following year Falco received authority over the province of Asia for 123/124, considered one of the pinnacles of a successful senatorial career. McDermott notes that both of his previous postings had been difficult ones, and he most likely spent his years in those distant places without his family; whether this was the case, there is evidence that his wife and son accompanied him to this province.

=== Retirement ===
When Falco returned home from Asia, he retired from his public career to his estates, likely near Tusculum. Pompeius Falco is last heard of in a letter by the young Marcus Aurelius to Fronto, likely written in 143, in which he recalls a visit to Falco's estate three years prior. There the elderly senator and soldier showed the boy and his father around the grounds, and pointed out a tree with numerous branches that Falco called a catachanna.

== Family ==
Falco married Sosia Polla, the daughter of Quintus Sosius Senecio, twice consul (cos. 99, 107), and the granddaughter of Sextus Iulius Frontinus, also a three-time consul (cos. 97, 98, 100); McDermott dates their marriage to after Falco's return from Judea—namely, either the year 108 or slightly later. They are known to have had at least one son, Quintus Pompeius Sosius Priscus, consul in 149.

Political offices
Preceded by Publius Aelius Hadrianus, and Marcus Trebatius Priscus as Ordinary consuls	Suffect consul of the Roman Empire; 108 with Marcus Titius Lustricus Bruttianus	Succeeded by Aulus Cornelius Palma Frontonianus II, and Publius Calvisius Tullus Ruso as Ordinary consuls
Preceded by Marcus Atilius Bradua	Roman governors of Britain; 118-122	Succeeded by Aulus Platorius Nepos
