= Quintus Pompeius Sosius Priscus =

2nd century Roman senator, consul and governor

Quintus Pompeius Sosius Priscus was a Roman senator active in the mid-second century AD, who held a number of offices in the emperor's service. Priscus served as ordinary consul for the year 149 as the colleague of Lucius Sergius Salvidienus Scipio Orfitus. His life is known entirely from inscriptions.

Priscus was the son of Quintus Pompeius Falco, consul of 108, and Sosia Polla. Earlier writers had confused him with his son, Quintus Pompeius Senecio Sosius Priscus, but a fragmentary inscription from Rome allowed experts to separate the evidence pertaining to each. By his lifetime, his branch of the Sosii had been granted Patrician status.

== Name ==
The complete name of Priscus has not come down to us. One inscription does preserve a large enough portion to indicate that he had a number of elements lacking from his father's name, but were passed on to his own son:

Quintus Pompeius [...] Bellicius Sollers Julius Acer Ducenius Proculus Rutilianus Rufinus Silius Valens Valerius Niger Claudius Fuscus Saxa Amyntianus Sosius Priscus

Some elements of his name are shared with other known men, suggesting that each of these men were involved in a testimony adoption, where in return for an inheritance Priscus assumed the adoptor's name. (Other elements may be shared with men about whom no trace has survived to our time.)

- Bellicius Sollers -- Lucius Bellicius Sollers was an eques whom the Emperor Trajan promoted to the Senate, and is thought to have been suffect consul during the reign of Trajan. While there is evidence for a daughter, Claudia Marcellina, none has been found for a son. (These two naming elements are also shared with another senator, Publius Cornelius Dexter Augus[tanus Alpin]us Bellicus Sollers Metilius [...]us Rutillianus.)
- Julius Acer -- Marcus Sedatius Severianus Julius Acer Metilius Nepos Rufinus Tiberius Rutilianus Censor, suffect consul in 153. It is conceivable that the craftsman carving the inscription confused elements in Priscus' name, and he shares more elements with Sedatius Severianus, namely Rufinus Rutillianus. Rather than Sedatius Severianus making Priscus his heir, it is likely an otherwise unknown Julius Acer (Rufinus Rutilianus) made both of these men his heir.
- Ducenius Proculus -- while there is a Gaius Ducenius Proculus, he was suffect consul in 87; it is doubtful this Proculus lived into Priscus' lifetime. However, it is plausible that the consul had a son with the same name who is otherwise unattested.

== Life ==
The cursus honorum of Priscus can be recovered from two inscriptions: the fragmentary one from Rome mentioned above, and one from Bononia in Aemilia. If we can trust the order of offices on this inscription to reflect the order they were held, his first recorded office was sevir equitum Romanorum of the annual review of the equites at Rome. Next was his membership as one of the tresviri monetalis, the most prestigious of the four boards that comprise the vigintiviri; assignment to this board was usually allocated to patricians or favored individuals. He then became a quaestor, which provided the office holder admission to the Senate. This was followed by his admission to the Roman priesthoods of sodales Hadrianales then the College of Pontiffs; the latter may have transpired prior to his accession to the consulate. He was also made a member of the sodales Antoniniani around that time. As a member of the Patrician order, Priscus acceded to the consulate two years after he was praetor.

After his consulate, Priscus became a member of the comites of emperor Marcus Aurelius. During this period, he was also proconsular governor of Asia for the term 163/164; according to Géza Alföldy, his son served as his legatus or assistant. If the restoration of the inscription from Rome can be trusted, Priscus also was decorated with dona militaria, possibly as a staff officer; McDermott suggests that this "was at the time of the northern wars between 167 and 180. I suspect his duties were less warlike than those of his co-eval son-in-law Pontius."

== Children ==
Priscus is known to have had at least two children:

- Quintus Pompeius Senecio Sosius Priscus, ordinary consul in 169.
- Pompeia Sosia Falconilla, who married Marcus Pontius Laelianus Larcius Sabinus, ordinary consul in 163.

Political offices
Preceded by Gaius Fabius Agrippinus, and Marcus Antonius Zeno as suffect consuls	Consul of the Roman Empire; 148 with Lucius Sergius Salvidienus Scipio Orfitus	Succeeded by Quintus Passienus Licinus, and Gaius Julius Avitus as suffect consuls
