= Lucius Cossonius Eggius Marullus =

Second-century Roman politician and senator

Lucius Cossonius Eggius Marullus was a Roman politician and senator in the second century AD.

Marullus came from the Hirpine city of Eclanum in Samnium. His grandfather was Lucius Eggius Marullus, suffect consul in 111 AD. In 184 AD, Marullus was elected as consul together with Gnaeus Papirius Aelianus as his colleague. In 198 AD, He was appointed Proconsul of Africa. In addition, Marullus was a member of the Flamen Priesthood. His son, Cossonius Scipio Orphitus, served as his Legate.
