= Quintus Sosius Senecio =

Late 1st/early 2nd century AD Roman senator, consul and governor

Quintus Sosius Senecio (fl. 1st century AD) was a Roman senator who was favored by the emperors Domitian and Trajan. As a result of this relationship, he was twice ordinary consul, an unusual and prestigious honor: first in 99, with Aulus Cornelius Palma Frontonianus as his colleague; and again in 107 as the colleague of Lucius Licinius Sura, who was himself consul for the third time.

== Career ==
Senecio's origins are unknown. He has been identified as the subject of an inscription where the name of the subject is lost, which provides us his cursus honorum. The earliest office recorded on this inscription was quattuorviri viarum curandarum, one of the four boards that comprised the vigintiviri; membership in one of these was a required first step toward a gaining entry into the Roman Senate. His next recorded office was as quaestor of the senatorial province of Achaea; upon completion of this traditional Republican magistracy he would be enrolled in the Senate. The inscription omits all mention of a term of service as military tribune; John D. Grainger speculates that Senecio may have served with Legio XXI Rapax, which was destroyed by the Iazyges in 92. He was the emperor's candidate for plebeian tribune and praetor, a clear honor; that the emperor's name is not provided suggests he was Domitian, who suffered damnatio memoriae after his death. After achieving the rank of praetor, Senecio was commissioned legatus legionis or commander of Legio I Minervia. He was then appointed legatus pro praetore or governor of Gallia Belgica for the term 96 to 98. It was while governor that Senecio provided early support to Trajan.

Senecio became consul ordinarius in 99. During the Dacian Wars, he held the governorship of Moesia Inferior. Afterwards he earned a second consulate in 107 as well as a statue at state expense.

== Personal details ==
Senecio was a member of literary circles. Pliny the Younger addressed two letters to a "Senecio" who is commonly identified with him. The first, beginning with "This year has produced a healthy crop of poets", is on the health of contemporary Roman literature. The second is a request for a commission as military tribune on behalf of a relative of Pliny's friend Gaius Calvisius Rufus. Plutarch also dedicated several of his Parallel Lives (Theseus 1, Demosthenes 1, Brutus 1) as well some of the individual Moralia (Quaestiones conviviales and Quomodo quis suos in virtute sentiat profectus) to Senecio. These include reminiscences about Plutarch's and Senecio's conversations at Athens, Patras and Rome, as well as at Plutarch's home in Boeotia, where Senecio attended the wedding of Plutarch's son.

Senecio married the daughter of Sextus Julius Frontinus, a three-time consul (cos. 97, 98, 100). They had a daughter, Sosia Polla, who married Quintus Pompeius Falco.

== Footnotes ==
Political offices
Preceded by Quintus Fulvius Gillo Bittius Proculus, and Publius Julius Lupus as consules suffecti	Consul of the Roman Empire; 99 with Aulus Cornelius Palma Frontonianus	Succeeded by Publius Sulpicius Lucretius Barba, and Senecio Memmius Afer as consules suffecti
Preceded by Lucius Minicius Natalis, and Quintus Licinius Silvanus Granianus Quadronius Proculus	Consul of the Roman Empire; 107 with Lucius Licinius Sura III, followed by Acilius Rufus	Succeeded by Gaius Minicius Fundanus, and Titus Vettennius Severus
