= Publius Calvisius Tullus Ruso =

Publius Calvisius Tullus Ruso was a Roman politician in the 2nd century AD.

== Biography ==
He was a member of gens Calvisia, from the province of Gallia Narbonensis. His father was Publius Calvisius Ruso Julius Frontinus, suffect consul in 84 AD. Emperor Vespasian gave his father the title of Patrician. He married Domitia Lucilla Major, a representative of the wealthy gens Domitia.

In 109 AD, Tullus Ruso was elected consul together with Aulus Cornelius Palma Frontonianus as his colleague. He remained influential after his consulship long into the reign of Trajan. He died before 120 AD.

His daughter Domitia Lucilla was the mother of the emperor Marcus Aurelius.
