= Quintus Fulvius Gillo Bittius Proculus =

Late 1st/early 2nd century Roman senator

Quintus Fulvius Gillo Bittius Proculus was a Roman senator who held at least one office in imperial service. He was suffect consul in autumn of AD 99 with M. Ostorius Scapula as his colleague. He is also known by the shorter form of his name, Quintus Bittius Proculus.

Proculus' family connections have been a matter of dispute. A number of scholars have attempted to connect him to the suffect consul of the year 76, Marcus Fulvius Gillo. Some have suggested that he was the son of the older Gillo; others that he was adopted by the older man. In his monograph on Roman naming practices, Olli Salomies finds either possibility unlikely, and points out the more likely possibilities are that "he could be a Bittius adopted by a Q. Fulvius; or he could be a Bittius whose mother was a sister of, or in some other way related to, M. Fulvius Gillo." Pliny the Younger refers to him in passing as the stepfather of his second wife, which would make him the husband of Pompeia Celerina.

The cursus honorum of Proculus is known only piecemeal. The earliest office attested for him is prefect of the aerarii Saturnii as the colleague of Publicius Certus, which he would have held after being praetor; Mireille Corbier dated his tenure in this office to the years 96 and 97. This financial office usually directly led to its officeholder attaining the consulate, but the prosecution of Pliny the Younger, although it failed to convict Certus, prevented him from reaching that office.

The other office Proculus is known to have held is proconsular governor of Asia; an inscription at Cyzicus allows his tenure to be dated to 115/116.

Proculus is attested to have been admitted to the Arval Brethren by the year 101. The inscriptions of this priesthood attest he attended their rituals in the years 105, 117, and 118. It is from the records of this priesthood that we learn he had died by 7 February 120, when Publius Malius Garbo was co-opted to fill the vacancy created by his death.

Political offices
Preceded by unknown as suffect consuls	Suffect consul of the Roman Empire; 99 with M. Ostorius Scapula	Succeeded by unknown as suffect consuls
