= Cassius Dio =

Greco-Roman statesman and historian (c. 165–c. 235)

Lucius Cassius Dio
- Δίων Κάσσιος
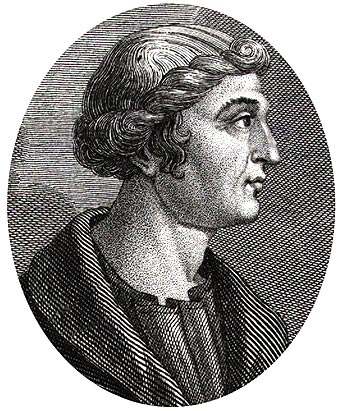
- 17th century illustration of Dio
- Born: c. 165 AD; Nicaea, Bithynia
- Died: c. 235 AD (aged approx. 70); Bithynia
- Occupations: Historian, senator, praetor, proconsul, consul
- Relatives: Cassius Apronianus (father), Cassius Dio (grandchild or great-grandchild)
- Writing career
- Subject: History
- Notable work: History of Rome

Lucius Cassius Dio (c. 165 – c. 235), (Note: He was named praetor by Pertinax (r. 194 AD) and assumed the office in 195 AD. Given that the minimum age for such office was 30, his birth date is given as 165, 164 or 163 AD. Some authors argue that he was born earlier, in about 155 AD, but this is usually not accepted. He probably died a few years before Alexander Severus's death in 235, but there is no way to determine this.) also known as Dio Cassius (Ancient Greek: Δίων Κάσσιος Dion Kassios), was a Roman historian and senator of maternal Greek origin. He published 80 volumes of the history of ancient Rome, beginning with the arrival of Aeneas in Italy. The volumes documented the subsequent founding of Rome (753 BC), the formation of the Republic (509 BC), and the creation of the Empire (27 BC) up until 229 AD, during the reign of Severus Alexander. Written in Koine Greek over 22 years, Dio's work covers approximately 1,000 years of history.

Many of his books have survived intact, alongside summaries edited by later authors such as Xiphilinus, a Byzantine monk of the 11th century, and Zonaras, a Byzantine chronicler of the 12th century.

== Biography ==
Lucius Cassius Dio (Note: The name "Lucius" is attested by AE 1985, 821. Another inscription (AE 1971, 430) attests "Cl(audius) Cassius Dio", but the extra letter is probably a stone cutter's error. Dio is also alleged to have had the cognomen "Cocceianus", but Alain Gowing argues that the evidence for it is insufficient, and the ascription is a Byzantine confusion with Dio Chrysostom, whom Pliny shows to be named Cocceianus.) was the son of Cassius Apronianus, a Roman senator and member of the Cassia gens, who was born and raised at Nicaea in Bithynia. Byzantine tradition maintains that Dio's mother was the daughter or sister of the Greek orator and philosopher, Dio Chrysostom; however, this relationship has been disputed. Although Dio was a Roman citizen, he wrote in Greek. Dio always maintained a love for his hometown of Nicaea, calling it "my home", as opposed to his description of his villa in Capua, Italy ("the place where I spend my time whenever I am in Italy").

For the greater part of his life, Dio was a member of the public service. He was a senator under Commodus and governor of Smyrna following the death of Septimius Severus; he became a suffect consul in approximately the year 205. Dio was also proconsul in Africa and Pannonia. Severus Alexander held Dio in the highest esteem and reappointed him to the position of consul in 229. Following his second consulship, while in his later years, Dio returned to his native Bithynia, where he eventually died.

Dio was either the grandfather or great-grandfather of another Cassius Dio, consul in 291.

== Roman History ==
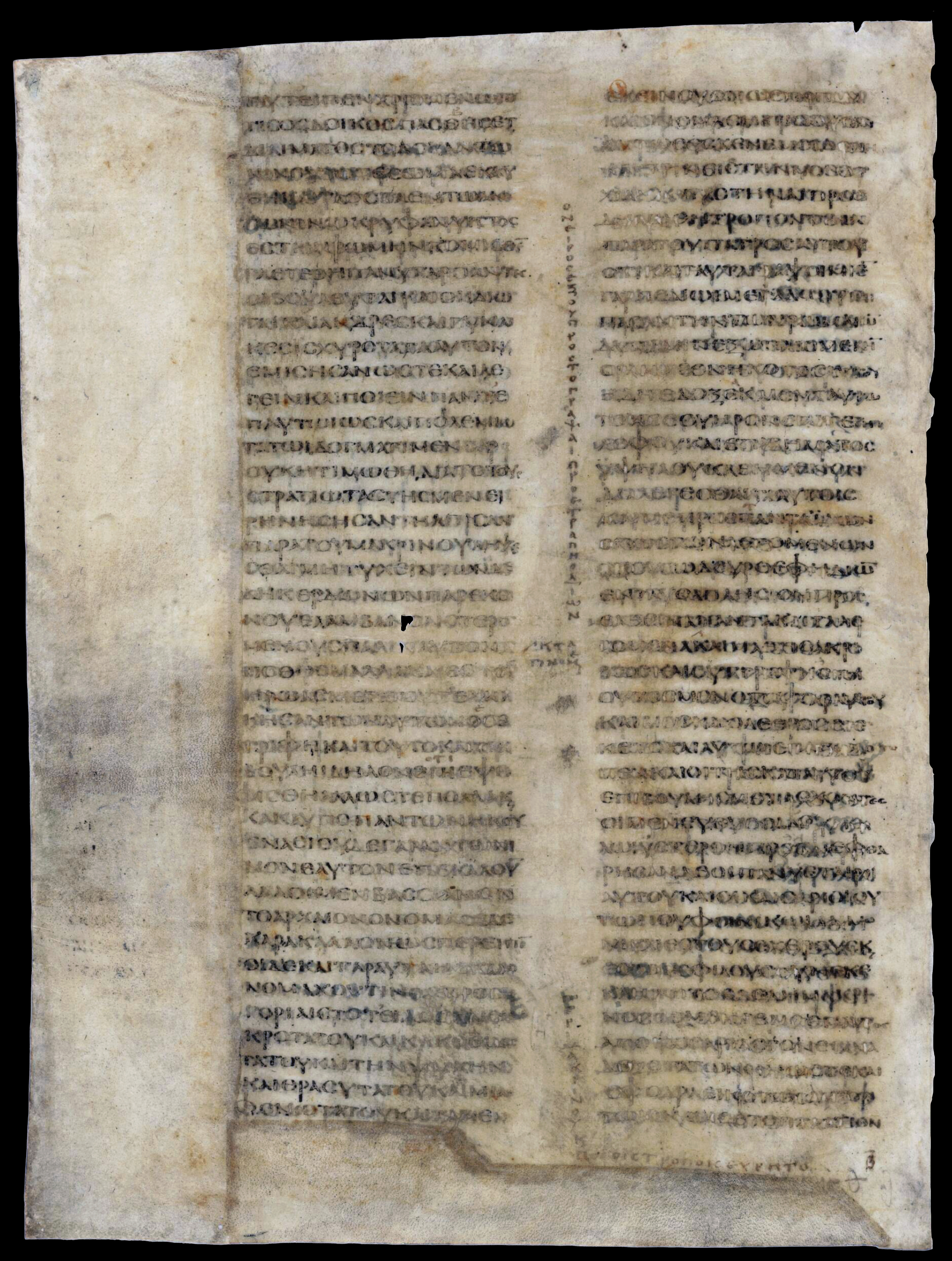
Excerpt (78.8.6-78.11.1) of Cassius Dio's Roman History from a 5th-century manuscript.

Dio published a Roman History (Ῥωμαϊκὴ Ἱστορία, Rhōmaïkḕ Historía) in 80 books in Greek, later translated into Latin as the Historia Romana. On the matter of its composition, he writes the following: "I spent ten years in collecting all the achievements of the Romans from the beginning down to the death of Severus [211 AD], and twelve years more in composing my work. As for subsequent events, they also shall be recorded, down to whatever point it shall be permitted me".

The books cover a period of approximately 1,400 years, beginning with the tales from Roman mythology of the arrival of the legendary Aeneas in Italy (c. 1200 BC) and the founding of Rome by his descendant Romulus (753 BC); as well as the historic events of the republican and imperial eras through 229 AD. The work is one of only three written Roman sources that document the British revolt of 60–61 AD led by Boudica. Until the first century BC, Dio provides only a summary of events; after that period, his accounts become more detailed.

Dio's work has often been deprecated as unreliable and lacking any overall political aim. Recently, however, some scholars have re-evaluated his work and have highlighted his complexity and sophisticated political and historical interpretations.

=== Survey of surviving books and fragments ===
The first 21 books have been partially reconstructed based on fragments from other works, as well as the 12th-century epitome of Joannes Zonaras who used Dio's Roman History as a main source. Scholarship on this part of Dio's work is scarce but the importance of the Early Republic and Regal period to Dio's overall work has recently been underlined. Books 22 through 35, which are only sparsely covered by fragments, were already lost by the times of Zonaras.

The books that follow, Books 36 through 54, are all nearly complete; they cover the period from 65 BC to 12 BC, or from the eastern campaign of Pompey and the death of Mithridates to the death of Marcus Vipsanius Agrippa. Book 55 contains a considerable gap, while Books 56 through 60 (which cover the period from 9–54 AD) are complete and contain events from the defeat of Varus in Germany to the death of Claudius.

Of the 20 subsequent books in the series, there remain only fragments and the meager abridgement of John Xiphilinus, a Byzantine monk from the 11th century sponsored by emperor Michael VII Doukas. The abridgment of Xiphilinus, as now extant, commences with Book 35 and continues to the end of Book 80. The last book covers the period from 222 to 229 AD (the first half of the reign of Alexander Severus).

=== Collections of book fragments ===
The fragments of the first 36 books have been collected in four ways:

Fragmenta Valesiana
Fragments that were dispersed throughout various writers, scholiasts, grammarians, and lexicographers, and were collected by Henri Valois.

Fragmenta Peiresciana
Large extracts, found in the section entitled "Of Virtues and Vices", contained in the collection, or portative library, compiled by order of Constantine VII Porphyrogenitus. The manuscript of this belonged to Nicolas-Claude Fabri de Peiresc.

Fragmenta Ursiniana
The fragments of the first 34 books, preserved in the second section of the same work by Constantine, entitled "Of Embassies". These are known under the name of Fragmenta Ursiniana, as the manuscript in which they are contained was found in Sicily by Fulvio Orsini.

Excerpta Vaticana
Excerpta Vaticana by Angelo Mai contains fragments of Books 1 to 35 and 61 to 80. Additionally, fragments of an unknown continuator of Dio (Anonymus post Dionem), generally identified with the 6th century historian Peter the Patrician, are included; these date from the time of Constantine. Other fragments from Dio that are primarily associated with the first 34 books were found by Mai in two Vatican manuscripts; these contain a collection that was compiled by Maximus Planudes. The annals of Joannes Zonaras also contain numerous extracts from Dio.

== Content ==
An outline of Roman History.

=== Books of Roman History ===
Book	Description
1	The Founding of Rome.
2	The seven legendary Roman Kings. The rape of Lucretia and her suicide, the Overthrow of the Roman monarchy and the shift towards a Republic.
3	The early Roman Republic.
4	Internal strife between plebes and patricians. Roman dictator is established as a concept and office.
5	The Conflict of the Orders, paused during times of crisis. Wars with the Volsci, Etruscans, Aequi, and Sabines, and the treason of Coriolanus. The Laws of the Twelve Tables.
6	The creation of the offices of consular tribune and of censor. Wars with the Etruscans, Faliscans, & with Veii.
7	War with the Gauls & Latins. The Capitol besieged. Failed coup of Marcus Manlius Capitolinus. Camillus serves several terms as dictator.
8	War is fought with the Samnites and with Capua. The people's debts are annulled by the tribunes.
9	War is fought with Tarentum and Epirus. Epirus is led by King Pyrrhus
10	Tarentum and Epirus are defeated. Rome intervenes in Volsinii by bolstering the nobility.
11	First Punic War. Creation of Roman navy. Recounting of Regulus
12	Rome wins the First Punic War. War is fought with the Gauls, the Faliscans, Liguria, Corsica, and Sardinia. Rome begins intervention in Greek affairs.
13	Start of the Second Punic War.
14	Second Punic War, continues. Fabius Maximus, elected dictator, pursues a policy of attrition.
15	Second Punic War continues. Battle of Cannae &the Siege of Syracuse & Roman capture of Capua. Death of Archimedes.
16	Second Punic War continues. Scipio's success in Spain.
17	End of Second Punic War and Roman victory.
18	War with Philip V of Macedonia, Battle of Cynoscephalae leads to Philip's defeat. The Carthaginians incite up the Gauls. Cato the Elder and his writings.
19	Rome's dealings with Greece continued. War with Antiochus. Death of Hannibal in exile in Bithynia.
20	War against Perseus & Dalmatia. Rome's dealings with Rhodes, Cappadocia, Egypt.
21	Third Punic War. Carthage and Corinth destroyed.
22–29	The Bacchanalia scandal. Wars in Spain, and against the Cimbri and Marsians. Discussion on Tiberius Gracchus.
30–35	Beginning of the Mithridatic Wars. Sulla's civil war.
36	The Armenian campaigns. Pompey's campaign against pirates
37	The career of Pompey. Campaigns against the Asiatic Iberians, the annexation of Syria and Phoenicia, and the First Triumvirate (Crassus, Caesar, and Pompey).
38	Exile of Cicero. Julius Caesar's first consulate.
39	Gallic War, continued. Caesar crosses into Britain. Ptolemy expelled from Egypt and restored.
40	Gallic War, continued. Caesar crosses into Britain a second time. Crassus is defeated and killed. Rift between Caesar and Pompey begins.
41	Caesar and his armies cross the Rubicon. Battle of Dyrrhachium, Battle of Pharsalus, Pompey's defeat.
42	Death of Pompey. Caesar given honors in Rome.
43	Caesar defeats Scipio and the younger Gnaeus Pompey. Caesar's triumphs celebrated in Rome. Ground is broken for the Forum of Caesar. The Julian calendar reforms issued.
44	Caesar's cult of personality and his murder.
45	Caesar's heir Octavian, and his character. The Second Triumvirate (Octavian, Antony, Lepidus). Rift between Antony and Octavian, and Cicero.
46	Octavian's victory over Antony.
47	Rule of the Third Triumvirate. Defeat of Brutus and Cassius at the Battle of Philippi.
48	Third Triumvirate continued. Octavian and Antony ally with, then defeat Sextus Pompey.
49	Octavian defeats Sextus Pompey and deprives Lepidus of his army and powers. Antony's defeat against the Parthians. Octavian conquers Pannonia. Rome acquires Mauretania.
50	Octavian and Antony fight each other, the latter is decisively defeated in the battle of Actium.
51	Antony and Cleopatra. Suicide of Antony. Octavian conquers Egypt.
52	Octavian prepares to become the sole ruler of Rome.
53	Octavian becomes sole ruler of Rome, and in doing so ushers in the imperial period. Organization of provincial administration is discussed.
54	Consolidation of power by Octavian, now called Augustus. Roman rule extends to Rhaetia, Noricum, the Maritime Alps, and the Chersonesus.
55	Dedication of the Precinct of Livia, the Campus Agrippae, the Diribitorium, the Temple of Mars. Tiberius retires to Rhodes. Augustus' heirs both die young. Empress Livia rises in influence.
56	The Disaster of Varus. Dedication of the Temple of Concord and the Portico of Livia. Death of Augustus and his funeral.
57	Tiberius assumes emperorship, his reign and character. Cappadocia becomes Roman. Deaths of Drusus and Germanicus Caesar.
58	Rise and fall of Sejanus. Continuation of Tiberius's reign, his consolidation of his hold on power, and his death.
59	Accession and reign of Caligula.
60–61	Accession and reign of Claudius. Britain conquered. Claudius dies, poisoned by his wife Agrippina. Nero assumes the emperorship.
62	Agrippina the Younger is put to death. Nero's reign includes the revolt of Boudicca and the Great Fire of Rome. Domitius Corbulo conquers Armenia. Seneca's plot and suicide.
63	Nero's reign continued, and his suicide. Vespasian begins the First Jewish–Roman War. The brief reigns of Galba and Otho.
64	The reign of Vitellius.
65	Vespasian's reign. His son Titus captures Jerusalem and destroys the Second Temple, winning the First Jewish War. Vespasian subdues Egypt. Temple of Jupiter Capitolinus rebuilt.
66	Upon the death of Vespasian, Titus assumes the emperorship for two years and his reign. The eruption of Vesuvius that buried Pompeii.
67	The reign and character of Domitian.
68	The brief reign of Nerva. Reign of Trajan. The Dacian Wars end in Roman victory. Successful campaigns in Armenia and Parthia. A major earthquake centered in Antioch. Trajan dies.
69	Trajan's adoptive son Hadrian succeeds to the throne. His character and interests. Antinous. Hadrian brutally suppresses the Bar Kokhba revolt. Hadrian's protracted illness and death.
70	The reign of Antoninus Pius.
71	Marcus Aurelius assumes the emperorship. The war against Vologaesus in Armenia. Roman bridge-building techniques are discussed.
72	Wars against the Marcomanni and the Iazyges. Cassius's revolt in Syria ends in his death. Character of Marcus Aurelius.
73	The reign of Marcus Aurelius' son Commodus and his character. His assassination.
74	The reign and assassination of Pertinax. Didius Julianus wins power by purchasing it from the Praetorian Guard. Julianus's reign, and his assassination.
75	Septimius Severus rise to the emperorship and his suppression of a rebellion.
76	Severus defeats Albinus. War in Caledonia, and second siege of Hatra in Mesopotamia: neither one particularly successful. Power of Plautianus, prefect of the city.
77	Eruption of Vesuvius. The downfall of Plautianus. Severus's campaign and death.
78	Caracalla's reign as emperor. The wars he fought, his character and his mass killings of Alexandrians are discussed.
79	Caracalla falls to Macrinus. Macrinus and his reign. Macrinus' reign primarily occupied with civil war. He is overthrown by Elagabalus.
80	The reign of Elagabalus, who is overthrown due to his excesses. Severus Alexander assumes the throne.

== See also ==
- Herodian
- Roman historiography
- Severan dynasty
- Tacitus

== Notes ==
Political offices
Preceded by Q. Aiacius Modestus Crescentianus; M. Pomponius Maecius Probus	Roman consul 229 with Severus Alexander	Succeeded by Lucius Virius Agricola; Sex. Catius Clementinus Priscillianus
