= Petronia gens =

Ancient Roman family

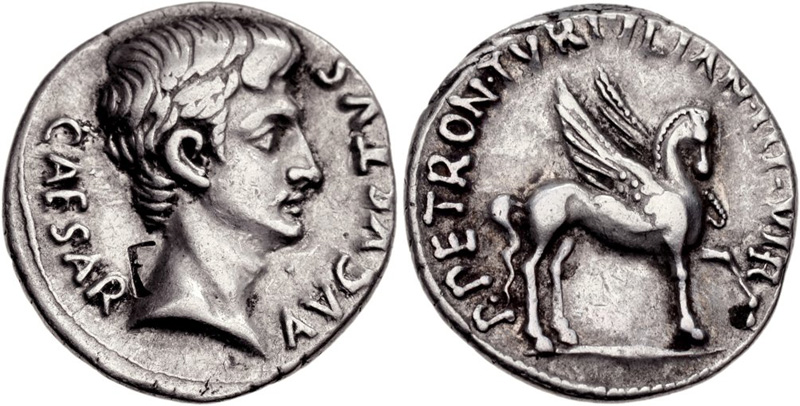
Denarius issued by Publius Petronius Turpilianus, circa 19 or 18 BC. The obverse depicts Augustus, the reverse Pegasus.

The gens Petronia was a plebeian family at ancient Rome. This gens claimed an ancient lineage, as a Petronius Sabinus is mentioned in the time of Lucius Tarquinius Superbus, the last of the Roman kings, but few Petronii are mentioned in the time of the Republic. They are frequently encountered under the Empire, holding numerous consulships, and eventually obtaining the Empire itself during the brief reign of Petronius Maximus in AD 455.

== Origin ==
The Petronii were of Sabine origin, as indicated by the surname Sabinus, belonging to the legendary figure from the time of Tarquin, and alluded to by coins minted by Publius Petronius Turpilianus, depicting the death of Tarpeia, whom according to legend was persuaded by the Sabines under Titus Tatius to open the citadel to them, in the time of Romulus. The nomen Petronius appears to be a patronymic surname derived from the Oscan praenomen Petro or Petrus, the Oscan equivalent of the Latin Quartus, fourth, and making Petronius cognate with a number of obscure Latin gentilicia, such as Quartius and Quartinius. An alternative derivation would be from the cognomen Petrus, a rustic, although this may also derive from the Oscan praenomen. Petronius belongs to a large class of gentilicia derived from other names ending in -o, most of which are plebeian.

== Praenomina ==
The early Petronii used the praenomina Gaius, Marcus, and Publius, all of which were very common throughout Roman history. Other names occur toward the end of the second century AD, including Quintus, Lucius, and Sextus, but these may have been inherited from other families.

== Members ==
This list includes abbreviated praenomina. For an explanation of this practice, see filiation.

- Petronius Sabinus, said to have copied the Sibylline Books during the reign of Lucius Tarquinius Superbus, with the assistance of a certain Marcus Tullius or Atilius.
- Gaius Petronius, one of the legates sent to Asia Minor in 156 BC, in order to study the conflict between Attalus of Pergamon and Prusias of Bithynia.
- Marcus Petronius Passer, mentioned in passing by Varro in Rerum Rusticarum, his treatise on agriculture.
- Petronius, a military tribune serving in the army of Marcus Licinius Crassus, the triumvir, in 55 BC. Petronius was with Crassus when his commander was slain by the Parthians.
- Petronius, one of the conspirators in the assassination of Caesar, was apprehended by Marcus Antonius in Asia, and put to death.
- Gaius Petronius, governor of Egypt, circa 25 to 21 BC, fought against Amanirenas of Kush, also known as "Candace of Aethiopia", and took a number of towns. A friend of Herod, Petronius supplied Judaea with grain during a famine.
- Publius Petronius Turpilianus, triumvir monetalis in the time of Augustus, is known from a number of remarkable coins.
- Petronius, (Note: Probably not Petronius Diodotus, as found in some manuscripts of Pliny, or Petronius Musa, as inferred from Galen, which seems to be a misunderstanding of Μουσας in the original.) perhaps the same person as the physician Marcus Petronius Heras, a writer on pharmacy mentioned by a number of sources. He must have lived toward the beginning of the first century AD.
- Marcus Petronius Heras, a physician mentioned in an inscription recorded by Jan Gruter, perhaps the same person as the writer on pharmacy.
- Publius Petronius, consul suffectus in AD 19, serving from the Kalends of July to the end of the year.
- Gaius Petronius Umbrinus, consul suffectus for the months of September to December, AD 25.
- Petronius, the centurion charged with guarding the tomb of Jesus, in the non-canonical Gospel of Peter.
- Publius Petronius (P. f.), succeeded Lucius Vitellius as governor of Syria from AD 37 to 41, with orders to install a statue of Caligula in the Temple at Jerusalem. He was a legate pro praetore under Claudius.
- Gaius Petronius Pontius Nigrinus, consul in AD 37, the year which saw the death of Tiberius.
- Aulus Petronius Lurco, consul suffectus in AD 58, serving from the Kalends of July to the end of the year.
- Gaius Petronius Arbiter an intimate friend of Nero, noted for his luxury and decadence. He was appointed proconsul of Bithynia, and later held the consulship. Accused of treason, he slowly weakened himself by bloodletting, until his death in AD 66. He is best known as the author of the Satyricon.
- Publius Petronius (P. f.) Turpilianus, consul in AD 61, and governor of Britain from 61 to 63. After the suppression of the Pisonian conspiracy, he was among those to whom Nero awarded the triumphal insignia; but Nero's favour caused Galba to have him put to death.
- Publius Petronius Niger, consul suffectus for the months of May to August in AD 62.
- Titus Petronius Niger, consul suffectus for the months of July and August in AD 63.
- Petronius Priscus, banished by Nero in AD 66, after the conspiracy of Piso was suppressed. Tacitus gives no indication that Priscus was in any way involved in the conspiracy, instead suggesting that his exile was arbitrary. He was permitted to settle in the islands of the Aegean.
- Marcus Petronius Umbrinus, consul suffectus in AD 81, probably for the months of September and October.
- Titus Petronius Secundus, praetorian prefect under Domitian, joined the conspiracy that led to the emperor's assassination.
- Petronius Quadratus, praefectus of Roman Egypt c. 126
- Lucius Petronius Sabinus, consul suffectus for the months of September and October, AD 145.
- Marcus Petronius Honoratus, praefectus of Roman Egypt from 147 to 148.
- Marcus Petronius Mamertinus, consul suffectus in AD 150.
- Marcus Petronius M. f. Sura Mamertinus, consul in AD 182.
- Marcus Petronius M. f. Sura Septimianus, brother of Sura Mamertinus, consul in AD 190.
- Petronia M. f., sister of Marcus Petronius Sura Mamertinus, married the senator Marcus Antoninus Antius Lupus.
- Petronius M. f. M. n. Antoninus, son of Marcus Petronius Sura Mamertinus.
- Quintus Petronius Didius Severus, father of the emperor Didius Julianus.
- Lucius Fulvius Gavius (Numisius?) Petronius Aemilianus, consul in AD 206.
- Lucius Petronius Taurus Volusianus, consul in AD 261, praefectus urbi, and praetorian prefect under the emperor Gallienus.
- Petronius Annianus, consul in AD 314.
- Petronius Probianus, consul in AD 322.
- Petronius Probinus, consul in AD 341.
- Sextus Claudius Petronius Probus, consul in AD 371.
- Anicius Petronius Probus, consul in AD 406.
- Saint Petronius, fifth century bishop of Bologna.
- Petronius Maximus, emperor for seventy-five days in AD 455, was torn apart by the mob at Rome.
- Petronius Probinus, consul in AD 489.
- Rufius Petronius Nicomachus Cethegus, consul in AD 504.

== See also ==
- List of Roman gentes

== Bibliography ==
- Polybius, Historiae (The Histories).
- Marcus Terentius Varro, Rerum Rusticarum (Rural Matters).
- Dionysius of Halicarnassus, Romaike Archaiologia (Roman Antiquities).
- Strabo, Geographica.
- Valerius Maximus, Factorum ac Dictorum Memorabilium (Memorable Facts and Sayings).
- Lucius Annaeus Seneca (Seneca the Younger), Apocolocyntosis Divi Claudii (The Gourdification of the Divine Claudius).
- Gaius Plinius Secundus (Pliny the Elder), Historia Naturalis (Natural History).
- Pedanius Dioscorides, De Materia Medica (On Medical Subjects).
- Flavius Josephus, Antiquitates Judaïcae (Antiquities of the Jews), Bellum Judaïcum (The Jewish War).
- Publius Cornelius Tacitus, Annales, Historiae, De Vita et Moribus Iulii Agricolae (On the Life and Mores of Julius Agricola).
- Plutarchus, Lives of the Noble Greeks and Romans.
- Gaius Suetonius Tranquillus, De Vita Caesarum (Lives of the Caesars, or The Twelve Caesars).
- Appianus Alexandrinus (Appian), Bellum Civile (The Civil War).
- Aelius Galenus (Galen), De Compositione Medicamentorum per Genera (On the Composition of Medications According to their Kind).
- Lucius Cassius Dio Cocceianus (Cassius Dio), Roman History.
- Eutropius, Breviarium Historiae Romanae (Abridgement of the History of Rome).
- Dictionary of Greek and Roman Biography and Mythology, William Smith, ed., Little, Brown and Company, Boston (1849).
- Theodor Mommsen et alii, Corpus Inscriptionum Latinarum (The Body of Latin Inscriptions, abbreviated CIL), Berlin-Brandenburgische Akademie der Wissenschaften (1853–present).
- Giovanni Battista de Rossi, Inscriptiones Christianae Urbis Romanae Septimo Saeculo Antiquiores (Christian Inscriptions from Rome of the First Seven Centuries, abbreviated ICUR), Vatican Library, Rome (1857–1861, 1888).
- René Cagnat et alii, L'Année épigraphique (The Year in Epigraphy, abbreviated AE), Presses Universitaires de France (1888–present).
- George Davis Chase, "The Origin of Roman Praenomina", in Harvard Studies in Classical Philology, vol. VIII (1897).
- Hans Petersen, "The Numeral Praenomina of the Romans", in Transactions of the American Philological Association, vol. xciii, pp. 347–354 (1962).
- Alan E. Samuel, Greek and Roman Chronology: Calendars and Years in Classical Antiquity, C. H. Beck, Munich (1972).
- Paul A. Gallivan, "Some Comments on the Fasti for the Reign of Nero", in Classical Quarterly, vol. 24, pp. 290–311 (1974), "The Fasti for the Reign of Gaius", in Antichthon, vol. 13, pp. 66–69 (1979), "The Fasti for A.D. 70–96", in Classical Quarterly, vol. 31, pp. 186–220 (1981).
- Guido Bastianini, "Lista dei prefetti d'Egitto dal 30^{a} al 299^{p}" (List of the Prefects of Egypt from 30 BC to AD 299), in Zeitschrift für Papyrologie und Epigraphik, vol. 17 (1975).
- Paul M. M. Leunissen, Konsuln und Konsulare in der Zeit von Commodus bis Severus Alexander (Consuls and Consulars from the Time of Commodus to Severus Alexander), Verlag Gieben, Amsterdam, (1989).
- Werner Eck, "Miscellanea Prosopographica", in Zeitschrift für Papyrologie und Epigraphik, vol. 42 (1981), "Die Fasti consulares der Regierungszeit des Antoninus Pius, eine Bestandsaufnahme seit Géza Alföldys Konsulat und Senatorenstand" (The Consular Fasti for the Reign of Antoninus Pius: an Inventory since Géza Alföldy's Konsulat und Senatorenstand), in Studia Epigraphica in Memoriam Géza Alföldy, Werner Eck, Bence Fehér, Péter Kovács, eds., Bonn, pp. 69–90 (2013).
