= Vettulenus =

Ancient Roman nomen gentilicium

Vettulenus is an ancient Roman nomen gentilicium. Notable people with this nomen include:

- Sextus Vettulenus Cerialis, Roman senator
- Marcus Vettulenus Civica Barbarus, Roman senator
- Gaius Vettulenus Civica Cerealis (died 88), Roman senator
- Sextus Vettulenus Civica Cerialis, Roman senator
