= Plautia (mother of Aelius Caesar) =

Roman woman of senatorial rank

Plautia was a Roman woman of senatorial rank whom Classical scholars believe lived in the late first century and early second century AD. No direct evidence of her existence has yet been found. Ronald Syme comments about her situation, "Plautia exemplifies a common phenomenon in the history of Imperial Rome; a fragment of knowledge rescued from the waters of oblivion, but a figure of consequence in the social and political history of the time."

== History ==
Edmund Groag first suggested her existence to explain otherwise baffling and contradictory statements about the familial relationships of senators related to the Antonine dynasty, taking her name from Avidia Plautia, daughter of Gaius Avidius Nigrinus, suffect consul in 110. Syme later identified more of her husbands and children, wryly commenting that while "it would be refreshing to discover aspects of social life not revealed in the correspondence of Pliny (divorce has no place in his decorous pages)", he admits the alternative to accepting Plautia's existence was to assume "Hadrian, freshly married to Vibia Sabina, chose to seduce the wife of Ceionius Commodus." More recently, Anthony Birley accepted her existence by placing her in his family tree of the relatives of Lucius Aelius Caesar, where she appears as the daughter of Lucius Aelius Lamia Plautius Aelianus, suffect consul in 80.

=== Issue ===
Plautia is believed to have married three different men, by whom she had at least four children:

- Lucius Ceionius Commodus, consul in 106
  - Lucius Aelius Caesar, father of the emperor Lucius Verus;
  - A Ceionius, identified as the surmised father of Marcus Caeionius Silvanus, consul in 156;
- Second wife of Gaius Avidius Nigrinus, suffect consul in 110, who died in the year 118
  - Avidia Plautia (Note: This is not the same Avidia as the one who married Lucius Aelius Caesar mentioned above.) who married Lucius Titius Epidius Aquilinus
- Second wife of Sextus Vettulenus Civica Cerialis, consul in 106
  - Marcus Vettulenus Civica Barbarus, consul in 157

== Nerva–Antonine family tree ==
Nerva–Antonine family tree

Q. Marcius Barea Soranus	Q. Marcius Barea Sura	Antonia Furnilla	M. Cocceius Nerva	Sergia Plautilla	P. Aelius Hadrianus
Titus (r. 79–81)	Marcia Furnilla	Marcia	Trajanus Pater	Nerva (r. 96–98)	Ulpia (Note: Sister of Trajan's father: Giacosa (1977), p. 7.)	Aelius Hadrianus Marullinus
Flavia (Note: Giacosa (1977), p. 8.)	Marciana (Note: Levick (2014), p. 161.)	C. Salonius Matidius (Note: Husband of Ulpia Marciana: Levick (2014), p. 161.)	Trajan (r. 98–117)	Plotina	P. Acilius Attianus	P. Aelius Afer (Note: Giacosa (1977), p. 7.)	Paulina Major (Note: DIR contributor (Herbert W. Benario, 2000), "Hadrian".)
Lucius Mindius (2)	Libo Rupilius Frugi (3)	Salonia Matidia (Note: Giacosa (1977), p. 9.)	L. Vibius Sabinus (1) (Note: Husband of Salonia Matidia: Levick (2014), p. 161.)
Paulina Minor	L. Julius Ursus Servianus (Note: Smith (1870), "Julius Servianus".)
Matidia Minor	Sabina	Hadrian (Note: Smith (1870), "Hadrian", pp. 319–322.) (r. 117–138)	Antinous (Note: Lover of Hadrian: Lambert (1984), p. 99 and passim; deification: Lamber (1984), pp. 2–5, etc.)
C. Fuscus Salinator I	Julia Serviana Paulina
M. Annius Verus (Note: Husband of Rupilia Faustina: Levick (2014), p. 163.)	Rupilia Faustina (Note: Levick (2014), p. 163.) (Note: It is uncertain whether Rupilia Faustina was Frugi's daughter by Salonia Matidia or another woman.)	Boionia Procilla	Cn. Arrius Antoninus
L. Ceionius Commodus	Appia Severa	C. Fuscus Salinator II
L. Caesennius Paetus	Arria Antonina	Arria Fadilla (Note: Levick (2014), p. 162.)	T. Aurelius Fulvus
L. Caesennius Antoninus	L. Commodus	Plautia	unknown (Note: Levick (2014), p. 164.)	C. Avidius Nigrinus
M. Annius Verus	Calvisia Domitia Lucilla (Note: Wife of M. Annius Verus: Giacosa (1977), p. 10.)	Fundania (Note: Wife of M. Annius Libo: Levick (2014), p. 163.)	M. Annius Libo	Faustina	Antoninus Pius (r. 138–161)	L. Aelius Caesar	Avidia
Cornificia	Marcus Aurelius (r. 161–180) (Note: Giacosa (1977), p. 10.)	Faustina Minor	C. Avidius Cassius (Note: The epitomator of Cassius Dio (72.22) gives the story that Faustina the Elder promised to marry Avidius Cassius. This is also echoed in HA "Marcus Aurelius" 24.)	Aurelia Fadilla	Lucius Verus (r. 161–169) (1)	Ceionia Fabia	Plautius Quintillus (Note: Husband of Ceionia Fabia: Levick (2014), p. 164.)	Q. Servilius Pudens	Ceionia Plautia
Cornificia Minor (Note: Levick (2014), p. 117.)	M. Petronius Sura	Commodus (r. 177–192)	Fadilla	M. Annius Verus Caesar	Ti. Claudius Pompeianus (2)	Lucilla	M. Plautius Quintillus	Junius Licinius Balbus	Servilia Ceionia
Petronius Antoninus	L. Aurelius Agaclytus (2)	Aurelia Sabina	L. Antistius Burrus (1)	Plautius Quintillus	Plautia Servilla	C. Furius Sabinus Timesitheus	Maecia Faustina	Junius Licinius Balbus?
Furia Sabinia Tranquillina	Gordian III (r. 238–244)

- (1) = 1st spouse
- (2) = 2nd spouse
- (3) = 3rd spouse
- Reddish-purple indicates emperor of the Nerva–Antonine dynasty
  lighter purple indicates designated imperial heir of said dynasty who never reigned
  grey indicates unsuccessful imperial aspirants
  bluish-purple indicates emperors of other dynasties
- dashed lines indicate adoption; dotted lines indicate love affairs/unmarried relationships
- Small Caps = posthumously deified (Augusti, Augustae, or other)

Notes:

Except where otherwise noted, the notes below indicate that an individual's parentage is as shown in the above family tree.

References:
- DIR contributors (2000). "De Imperatoribus Romanis: An Online Encyclopedia of Roman Rulers and Their Families".
- Giacosa, Giorgio (1977). Women of the Caesars: Their Lives and Portraits on Coins. Translated by R. Ross Holloway. Milan: Edizioni Arte e Moneta. ISBN 0-8390-0193-2.
- Lambert, Royston (1984). Beloved and God: The Story of Hadrian and Antinous. New York: Viking. ISBN 0-670-15708-2.
- Levick, Barbara (2014). Faustina I and II: Imperial Women of the Golden Age. Oxford University Press. ISBN 978-0-19-537941-9.
- Smith, William, ed. (1870). Dictionary of Greek and Roman Biography and Mythology.

== See also ==
- Vistilia
- Postumia (mother of Decimus Brutus Albinus)
