= Achaia (Roman province) =

Coordinates: 38.7200°N 22.5400°E

Achaia Ἀχαΐα
- Province of the Roman Empire
- 27 BC–7th century
- The province of Achaia within the Roman Empire, c. 125 AD
- Capital: Corinth
- Historical era: Antiquity
  - Separated from the Province of Macedonia: 27 BC
  - Reorganized into the Theme of Hellas and Peloponnese: 7th century
Preceded by	Succeeded by
Macedonia (Roman province); Achaean League	Hellas (theme); Peloponnese (theme)
- Today part of: Greece

Achaia (Ancient Greek: Ἀχαΐα), sometimes spelled Achaea, was a province of the Roman Empire, consisting of the Peloponnese, Attica, Boeotia, Euboea, the Cyclades and parts of Phthiotis, Aetolia and Phocis. In the north, it bordered on the provinces of Epirus vetus and Macedonia. The region was annexed by the Roman Republic in 146 BC following the sack of Corinth by the Roman general Lucius Mummius, who was awarded the surname "Achaicus" ('conqueror of Achaia'). Initially part of the Roman province of Macedonia, it was made into a separate province by Augustus.

Achaia was a senatorial province, thus free from military men and legions, and one of the most prestigious and sought-after provinces for senators to govern. Athens was the primary center of education for the imperial elite, rivaled only by Alexandria, and one of the most important cities in the Empire. Achaia was among the most prosperous and peaceful parts of the Roman world until late antiquity, when it first suffered from barbarian invasions. The province remained prosperous and highly urbanized, however, as attested in the 6th-century Synecdemus.

The Slavic invasions of the 7th century led to widespread destruction, with much of the population fleeing to fortified cities, the Aegean islands and Italy, while some Slavic tribes settled the interior. The territories of Achaia remaining in Byzantine hands were grouped into the theme of Hellas.

== History ==
=== Conquest and Republican period ===
In 150–148 BC the Romans fought the Fourth Macedonian War, after which they annexed Macedon, formerly the largest and most powerful state in mainland Greece. In 146 BC the Achaean League initiated the Achaean War against Rome. The contemporary historian Polybius blames the demagogues of the cities of the Achaean League for encouraging a rash decision and inciting a suicidal war. The League was quickly defeated by Lucius Mummius and its main city, Corinth, was destroyed. After the war, the Romans annexed mainland Greece. A group of ten commissioners "put down democracies" in the Greek cities (Pausanias) through a programme of "constitutional restructuring" which involved the introduction of property qualifications for participating in civic politics, temporarily abolished the Achaean, Boeotian, Locrian, and Phocaean Leagues, and levied tribute on the individual cities. However, the cities remained mostly self-governing. Athens and Sparta, which had not participated in the war remained autonomous and free. It is disputed whether Greece became part of the Roman province Macedonia or was left unincorporated. Interventions by the governor of Macedonia in Greek affairs are attested, but also the dispatch of separate legates direct from Rome. Roman governance over the following century remained "rather ad hoc."

In the Dyme Affair of 144 BC, a faction in the city of Dyme passed laws "contrary to the type of government granted by the Romans," staged a revolution, and destroyed their town hall and official records. At the request of the Dymaean town councillors, Quintus Fabius Maximus (Note: According to the classical scholar Robert M. Kallet-Marx, if the date of 144 BC is accurate, the Quintus Fabius Maximus in question is almost certainly Quintus Fabius Maximus Servilianus. Less likely possibilities include Quintus Fabius Maximus Eburnus, Quintus Fabius Maximus Aemilianus, and Quintus Fabius Maximus Allobrogicus.) issued a ruling, sentencing the revolutionaries to death. An inscription recording judicial decisions made in the Greek city of Demetrias in the mid-second century BC says that the judgements were made in accordance with local law and "the edicts and judgements of the Romans", indicating that Roman law was already considered to apply to the region only a few years after the Achaean War.

In the following decades, many Greek communities sought to establish treaty relationships of "friendship and alliance" with Rome, apparently finding this preferable to free status. Treaties are attested, mostly by inscriptions, with Epidaurus and Troezen in the late second century BC, Astypalaea in 105 BC, Thyrium in 94 BC. The cities probably sought these treaties as a way of safeguarding their territory from their larger neighbours. Rome was increasingly called upon by the Greek communities to arbitrate in disputes between them, instead of seeking inter-state arbitration as had been common in the Hellenistic period. In these disputes, "friends and allies" of the Romans were usually favoured.

==== Mithridatic and civil wars ====
The First Mithridatic War (89–85 BC) was fought in Attica and Boeotia, two regions which were to become part of the province of Achaia. In 89 BC, Mithradates VI Eupator, king of Pontus, seized the Roman Province of Asia (in western Anatolia). Mithridates then sent Archelaus (his leading military commander) to southern Greece, where he established Aristion as a tyrant in Athens. The Roman consul Lucius Cornelius Sulla landed in Epirus (in western Greece) and marched on Athens. He marched through Boeotia on his way to Attica. Sulla besieged Athens and Piraeus in 87-86 BC and then sacked Athens and destroyed Piraeus. He then defeated Archelaus at the Battle of Chaeronea and the Battle of Orchomenus, both fought in Boeotia in 86 BC. Roman rule was preserved. Following the war, Sulla pardoned the Greek cities that had followed Mithridates and restored the legal systems that had been given to them by the Romans previously.

As the part of the Roman East closest to Italy, Greece was a central theatre of the civil wars of the Late Republic. The war between Julius Caesar and Pompey the Great culminated in Caesar's victory at the Battle of Pharsalus in Thessaly in 48 BC. In 46 BC, southern Greece was separated out from Macedonia as a separate province for the first time by Julius Caesar, who placed it under a proconsul, but this was reversed at some point after his assassination in 44 BC. Caesar also ordered the refoundation of Corinth, abandoned since 146 BC, as a Roman colony. Caesar's assassins, led by Marcus Junius Brutus and Gaius Cassius Longinus, based themselves in Greece during the Liberators' civil war, until their defeat by Octavian and Mark Antony of the Second Triumvirate at the Battle of Philippi in 42 BC. After the battle, the Second Triumvirate assigned Greece along with the rest of the East to Mark Antony, who remained in control of it until his defeat by Octavian at the Battle of Actium in 31 BC.

=== Principate ===
The Roman Empire under Hadrian (r. 117–138), showing the senatorial province of Achaia (southern Greece)

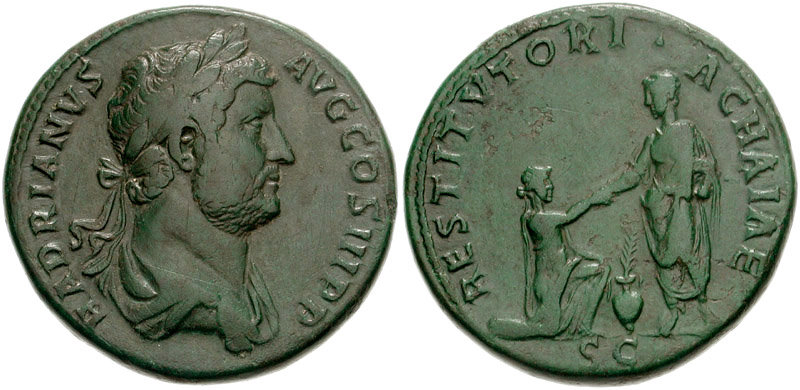
Sestertius of Hadrian celebrating Achaia province.

After the defeat of Antony and Cleopatra at the Battle of Actium, the Emperor Augustus separated Greece, Thessaly, and part of Epirus from Macedonia in 27 BC. The new province was named Achaia and was a senatorial province (Macedonia remained a senatorial province as well). In AD 15, Emperor Tiberius, responding to complaints of mismanagement by the senatorial proconsul made Achaia and Macedonia Imperial provinces and placed both of them under the control of Gaius Poppaeus Sabinus, the Imperial procurator of Moesia. After Sabinus' death in AD 35, this situation continued under the new procurator, Publius Memmius Regulus, until AD 44, when Emperor Claudius separated Macedonia and Achaia once more and restored them to the Senate.

The Roman Emperor Nero visited Greece in AD 66, and performed at the Ancient Olympic Games, despite the rules against non-Greek participation. He was honoured with a victory in every contest, and in the following year, he proclaimed the freedom of the Greeks at the Isthmian Games in Corinth, just as Flamininus had over 200 years previously. This grant of freedom was cancelled by Vespasian, who is meant to have quipped that "the Greeks had forgotten how to be free."

Hadrian (117–138) was fond of the Greeks, particularly Athens. He saw himself as an heir to Theseus and Pericles and had served as an eponymous archon of Athens before he became emperor. He carried out constitutional reforms at Athens in 126 and instituted a special 'council of the Panhellenes', where representatives of all Greek states met to discuss religious affairs, in Athens and under Athenian leadership. Hadrian was also responsible for large scale construction projects there, such as the completion of the Temple of Olympian Zeus. The Athenians built the Arch of Hadrian in his honour nearby. Construction was also carried out by local notables, many of whom became Roman citizens and joined the imperial elite, most notably Herodes Atticus.

During the Marcomannic Wars, in 170 or 171, the Costoboci invaded Roman territory, sweeping south through the Balkans to Achaia, where they sacked the sanctuary of Demeter and Persephone at Eleusis. Even though much of the invasion force was spent, the local resistance was insufficient and the procurator Lucius Julius Vehilius Gratus Julianus was sent to Greece with a small force to clear out the remnants of the invaders.

==== Administration ====
Many of the cities in the province, including Athens, Delphi, Thespis, and Plataea, were "free cities" and did not fall under the authority of the governor. From some time in the reign of Trajan a separate official the corrector was appointed to oversee their affairs. This office was increasingly merged with that of the provincial governor as time went on.

Legal cases could be appealed to the governor. He was advised by a "council" (consilium) and often delegated judicial powers to members of the council or other officials. There were also juries of provincials, composed of both Greeks and Roman citizens resident in the province. Cases regarding borders between provinces, free cities, and Roman colonies were usually decided by the emperor. Cases could only be appealed to these authorities if they involved more than a certain amount of money, involved status, or carried the death penalty.

==== Culture ====
The Pax Romana was the longest period of peace in Greek history, and Greece became a major crossroads of maritime trade between Rome and the Greek-speaking eastern half of the empire. The Greek language served as a lingua franca in the East and in Italy, and many Greek intellectuals such as Galen would perform most of their work in Rome. Roman culture was highly influenced by the Greeks; as Horace said, Graecia capta ferum victorem cepit ("Captive Greece captured her rude conqueror"). The epics of Homer inspired the Aeneid of Virgil, and authors such as Seneca the Younger wrote using Greek styles. Some Roman nobles regarded the contemporary Greeks as backwards and petty, while still embracing the Greeks' literature, philosophy, and heritage.

During this time, Greece and much of the rest of the Roman East came under the influence of early Christianity. The apostle Paul of Tarsus preached in Philippi, Corinth and Athens, and Greece soon became one of the most highly Christianized areas of the Empire. He referred in the opening lines of his Second Letter to the Corinthians to "all the saints who are in the whole of Achaia".

=== Later Roman Empire ===
Under Diocletian, the province of Achaia became a subdivision of the new diocese of Moesia. Under Constantine, the diocese was split and Achaia became part of the Diocese of Macedonia, which was itself assigned to the Praetorian prefecture of Italy or Illyricum at different points in the fourth century AD.

In 267, the Heruli led a naval invasion of the Aegean, before landing near Sparta and plundering the Peloponnese, including not only Sparta, but also Corinth, Argos, and the sanctuary of Zeus at Olympia. They then moved north and sacked Athens, before being defeated by a local force led by the Athenian Dexippus, whose writings were a source for later historians. In the aftermath of this invasion, much of the classical and imperial monuments of Athens were spoliated to build the post-Herulian wall, which enclosed only a small area around the Acropolis. Although a smaller city, Athens remained a centre of Greek culture and especially of Neo-Platonist pagan philosophy.

Greece was again invaded in 395 by the Visigoths under Alaric I. Stilicho, who ruled as a regent for Emperor Arcadius, evacuated Thessaly, and Arcadius' chief advisor Eutropius allowed Alaric to enter Greece, where he looted Athens, Corinth and the Peloponnese. Stilicho eventually drove him out around 397 and Alaric was made magister militum in Illyricum.

Greece remained part of the relatively cohesive and robust eastern half of the Empire, which eventually became the center of the imperial remnant, the Eastern Roman Empire. Contrary to outdated visions of late Antiquity, the Greek peninsula was most likely one of the most prosperous regions of the Empire. Older scenarios of poverty, depopulation, barbarian destruction, and civil decay have been revised in light of recent archaeological discoveries. In fact the polis, as an institution, appears to have remained prosperous until at least the 6th century. Contemporary texts such as Hierokles' Syndekmos affirm that late antiquity Greece was highly urbanised and contained approximately eighty cities. This view of extreme prosperity is widely accepted today, and it is assumed between the 4th and 7th centuries AD, Greece may have been one of the most economically active regions in the eastern Mediterranean.

== Economy ==
Copper, lead, and silver mines were exploited in Achaia, though production was not as great as the mines of other Roman-controlled areas, such as Noricum, Britannia, and the provinces of Hispania. Marble from Greek quarries was a valuable commodity.

Educated Greek slaves were much in demand in Rome in the role of doctors and teachers, and educated men were a significant export. Achaia also produced household luxuries, such as furniture, pottery, cosmetics, and linens. Greek olives and olive oil were exported to the rest of the Empire.

== List of Roman governors ==
- Publius Rutilius Nudus (c. 89 BC);
- Gaius Quinctius, Gaius filius, Trogus (50s BC);
- Publius Rutilius Lupus (48 BC);
- Servius Sulpicius Rufus (46—45 BC);
- Manius Acilius Glabrio Caninianus (45—44 BC);
- Mescinius (between 27 BC and AD 14);
- Atidius Geminus (before AD 25);
- Gaius Poppaeus Sabinus (with Macedonia and Moesia, AD 15–35)
- Publius Memmius Regulus (with Macedonia, AD 35–44);
- Quintus Granius Bassus (between 41 and 54);
- Lucius Junius Gallio Annaeanus (before 54);
- Aegeates (c. 70s);
- Titus Avidius Quietus (91—92);
- Gaius Avidius Nigrinus (c. 90s);
- Armenius Brocchus (c. 90s);
- L. Munatius Gallus (c. 90s);
- M. Mettius Rufus (c. 90s);
- Lucius Herennius Saturninus (98—99);
- Lucius Julius Marinus Caecilius Simplex (99—100);
- C. Caristanius Julianus (100—101);
- Gaius Minicius Fundanus (between 101 and 103);
- Cassius Longinus (before 109);
- Gaius Avidius Nigrinus (between 105 and 110);
- Titus Calestrius Tiro Orbius Speratus (111—112);
- Cassius Maximus (116—117);
- Gaius Valerius Severus (117—118);
- Clodius Granianus (118—119);
- T. Prifernius Paetus Rosianus Geminus (122—123);
- Lucius Antonius Albus (127—128);
- C. Julius Severus (133—134);
- Gaius Julius Scapula (135—136);
- Julius Candidus (136—137);
- Lucius Marcius Celer Marcus Calpurnius Longus (between 134 and 144);
- Q. Licinius Modestinus Sex. Attius Labeo (144—145);
- Sextus Quintilius Condianus and Sextus Quintilius Valerius Maximus (together, between 170 and 175);
- Lucius Albinus Saturninus (between 175 and 182);
- Gaius Sabucius Maior Caecilianus (184—185);
- Lucius Calpurnius Proculus (184—185);
- Gaius Caesonius Macer Rufinianus (c. 192);
- Pupienus Maximus (late 2nd century);
- Gaius Asinius Protimus Quadratus (between 192 and 211);
- [M.?] Claudius Demetrius (between 193 and 198);
- Marcus Aemilius Saturninus (between 192 and 211);
- Marcus Aurelius Amarantus (between 193 and 211);
- Lucius Julius Julianus (between 198 and 211);
- Aurelius Proculus (late 2nd century);
- Quintus Flavius Balbus (between 200 and 213);
- Lucius Lucius Priscillianus (between 211 and 217);
- Gnaeus Claudius Leonticus (first quarter of the 3rd century);
- Rutilius Pudens Crispinus (234—237);
- Marcus Ulpius (end of the 2nd/beginning of the 3rd century);
- [Ge]minius Modestus (between 222 and 235);
- [...]us Paulinus (during the Severan dynasty);
- Ti. Claudius Ti. Me[vius P]risc[us J]unior (between 221 and 250):
- Valens Thessalonicus (250s, under Gallienus);
- Aurelius Valerius Symmachus Tullianus (c. 319);
- Strategius Musonianus (353);
- Flavius Hermogenes (350s);
- Vettius Agorius Praetextatus (c. 364).

== List of Roman Correctors of the Free Cities ==
Name	Dates	Title	Notes
Maximus	ca. 100-110	Corrector of the free cities	Pliny Letters 8.24; Arrian Epict. 3.7
Gaius Avidius Nigrinus	ca. 114	Legatus Augusti pro praetore	FD III 4, no. 290–296; SEG 52.139 Previously governor of Achaia.
Publius Pactumeius Clemens	ca. 122?	Legatus of the Divine Hadrian to Athens, Thespiae, and Plataea	CIL VIII 7059. Son-in-law of governor Titus Prifernius Geminus.
Lucius Aemilius Juncus	ca. 134	Legatus Augusti pro praetore; Justice-giver; Corrector of the Free Cities	
Severus	ca. 139	Prefect	IG II² 1092
Sextus Quintilius Condianus and Sextus Quintilius Valerius Maximus	ca. 170 and 175	Rulers of Greece	Together, combining the role with governorship.
Claudius Demetrius	ca. 193-198	Legatus Augusti pro praetore; Proconsul; Corrector of the Free Cities	Combining role with governorship.
Tiberus Claudius Callippianus Italicus	ca. 198-211	Legatus Augusti pro praetore; Consular; Corrector of the Free Cities	IG II² 4215. Combining role with governorship.
Egnatius Proculus	ca. 198-211	Consular; Corrector	IG V 1, 541.
Tiberius Claudius Suatianus Proculus	ca. 200-206	Curator of Athens and Patras	ILS 9488.
Gnaeus Claudius Leonticus	ca. 200-217	Counsular and Corrector of Achaia; Proconsul	SIG^{3} 877; FD III 4, 269–271, 331A-B. Combining role with governorship.
Gaius Licinius Telemachus	209	Legatus Augusti pro praetore; Clarissimus; Curator of Athens	IG II² 1077; 2963. Combining role with governorship?
Paulinus	ca. 200-235	Governor and Corrector of Greece	IG V 1, 538. Combining role with governorship.
Lucius Egnatius Victor Lollianus	ca. 230	Clarissimus Counsular; Corrector of Achaia	IG VII 2510.

== See also ==
- History of Roman and Byzantine Greece
- Roman province

== Bibliography ==
- Girdvainyte, Lina (2020). "Law and Citizenship in Roman Achaia: Continuity and Change". In Czakowski, Kimberley; Eckhardt, Benedikt (eds.). Law in the Roman provinces. Oxford: Oxford University Press. pp. 210–242. ISBN 978-0-19-884408-2.
- Kouremenos, Anna (Ed) 2022. The Province of Achaea in the 2nd Century CE: The Past Present. London: Routledge. ISBN 9781032014852
- Oliver, James H. (1973). "Imperial Commissioners in Achaia". Greek, Roman, and Byzantine Studies. 14: 389–405.
- Oliver, J. H. (1970). Marcus Aurelius: : Aspects of Civic and Cultural Policy. Princeton.
