= Marcus Vettulenus Civica Barbarus =

2nd century Roman senator and consul

Marcus Vettulenus Civica Barbarus was a Roman senator of the second century AD. A member of the Patrician class, he held the office of consul ordinarius in 157 with another patrician, Marcus Metilius Aquillius Regulus, as his colleague. Barbarus was also a member of the sodales Antoniniani, a religious fraternity which attended to the cult of the emperor Antoninus Pius.

== Family ==
The Vettuleni were an Italian family, likely from Sabinum. Barbarus himself was the half-brother of Lucius Aelius, the biological father of the Emperor Lucius Verus; they shared the same mother, Plautia. While the identity of Lucius Aelius' father is certain (Lucius Ceionius Commodus, the consul ordinarius of 106), the authorities differ on the identity of Barbarus' father. Ronald Syme notes that a Greek inscription from Argos that attests to his filiation as "Sex. f.", and his tribe as "Quirna", but little more is known of his father. Géza Alföldy asserts he was the son of Sextus Vettulenus Civica Pompeianus, the consul ordinarius of 136, while Anthony Birley states Civica Pompeius was another half-brother of Barbarus and their shared father was Sextus Vettulenus Civica Cerialis, the consul ordinarius of 106.

== Career ==
His career began in his teens with the vigintiviri, as one of the tresviri monetalis; assignment to this board was usually allocated to patricians or favored individuals. This was followed at the age of 25 as a quaestor in the prestigious service to the Emperor. In his 32nd or 33rd year, Barbarus was appointed consul, the usual age for patricians.

Following his consulate, Barbarus took an interest in intellectual matters. G.W. Bowersock states that from 162 to 165 Barbarus was a regular attendee to Galen's anatomy demonstrations in Rome; other distinguished Romans in the audience included Lucius Sergius Paullus, consul for the second time in 168 and urban prefect, and Gnaeus Claudius Severus, consul for the second time in 173. Barbarus was also an acquaintance of Herodes Atticus, a prominent member of the Second Sophistic: Philostratus tells us that Herodes wrote Barbarus a number of letters. Around the year 164, he became one of the comes Augustalis, the inner circle of advisors in attendance on the Emperor; this was when Barbarus and the empress Faustina escorted Lucilla to Ephesus where she married Lucius Verus.

== See also ==
- List of Roman consuls

Political offices
Preceded by Quintus Canusius Praenestinus, and Gaius Lusius Sparsus as consules suffecti	Consul of the Roman Empire; 157 with Marcus Metilius Aquillius Regulus Nepos Volusius Torquatus Fronto	Succeeded by Lucius Roscius Aelianus, and Gnaeus Papirius Aelianus as consules suffecti
