= Titus Avidius Quietus =

Late 1st century/early 2nd century senator, consul and governor

Consul of the Roman Republic
- In office May 93? – September 93? Serving with Sextus Lusianus Proculus
- Preceded by: Sextus Pompeius Collega with Quintus Peducaeus Priscinus
- Succeeded by: Gaius Cornelius Rarus Sextius Naso with Tuccius Cerialis

Personal details
- Born: Unknown Possibly Faenza, Italy
- Died: Unknown (by 107 AD)
- Spouse: Unknown
- Children: Titus Avidius Quietus

Military service
- Allegiance: Roman Empire
- Commands: legate of Legio VIII Augusta; Governor of Britannia

Titus Avidius Quietus (died by 107 AD) was a Roman politician and senator active during the reigns of the emperors Domitian, Nerva and Trajan. The offices he held included suffect consul in AD 93 and governor of Roman Britain around 98.

== Background ==
Pliny the Younger mentions that Quietus was an intimate friend of the Stoic philosopher Publius Clodius Thrasea Paetus, a fact Anthony Birley uses to deduce Quietus was born in the early AD 40s. Literary references to other members of his family, the Avidii, indicates they had their origins in Faventia (modern Faenza, Italy), located on the Via Aemilia. Archeological evidence points to Quietus owning at least two houses at Rome, and inscriptions found in Sardinia indicate he owned estates on that island.

== Political career ==
Only two posts from his career before he was appointed to the consulship are known. In 82 the veterans of Legio VIII Augusta stationed in Germania Inferior asked Quietus, who is described as leg. Aug. ornatissimo viro, to become the patron of the colony of Deultum in Thrace, where they had settled. This petition, recorded in an inscription set up in Rome, led Birley to suspect that Quietus "was chosen as patron of Deultum because he was legionary legate at the time the men were settled, i.e. in 82." Later, perhaps in 91–2, Quietus served as proconsul of Achaea; Birley suggests it was while in this post that Quietus became the friend of Plutarch, who mentions him fondly in his Quaest. conv. and De fraterno amore.

Birley notes that "at first sight it is a little surprising" that Quietus, with clear connections to the Stoics, was appointed to a consulship under Domitian, especially in 93, "the very year when Domitian carried out a major purge of the Stoics." Birley explains that Domitian may have hoped to reconcile with the group until the last moment. Following Domitian's assassination in 96, Quietus spoke in defense of Pliny the Younger before the Senate when the latter attempted to obtain revenge for the Stoic leader Helvidius Priscus. Soon after this speech, he was appointed governor of Roman Britain, despite Quietus lacking recent military experience. Birley believes his appointment fits the pattern of Nerva's rule, who appointed a number of elder statesmen to positions of power.

His career after Britain, if any, is unknown. Birley concludes that he was dead by the time Pliny wrote his second letter mentioning him, which experts date to c. 107.

== Family ==
Literary references to other members of his family, the Avidii, indicates they had their origins in Faventia (modern Faenza, Italy), located on the Via Aemilia. Quietus had a son of the same name. The younger Avidius Quietus was suffect consul in 111, and later Proconsul of Asia. The nephew of the older Quietus, Gaius Avidius Nigrinus, consul in 110, was put to death at Faventia in 118 on charges of conspiring against Hadrian. However Nigrinus' daughter, Avidia, married the man Hadrian later was to adopt and make his successor, Lucius Ceionius Commodus.

Political offices
| Preceded by Sextus Pompeius Collega, and Quintus Peducaeus Priscinus as ordinary consuls | Suffect consul of the Roman Empire; 93 with Sex. Lusianus Proculus | Succeeded by Gaius Cornelius Rarus Sextius Naso, and Tuccius Cerialis as suffect consuls |
| Preceded by Publius Metilius Nepos | Roman governors of Britain c. 98 | Succeeded by Lucius Neratius Marcellus |
