= Avidius Cassius =

Roman Egyptian general and usurper (c. 130–175)

Gaius Avidius Cassius
- Usurper of the Roman Empire
- Reign: c.April to July 175
- Born: c. 130 AD; Cyrrhus, Syria
- Died: July 175 AD; Egypt
- Spouse: Volusia Vettia Maeciana
- Issue: Avidius Heliodorus; Avidius Maecianus; Avidia Alexandra
Names
- Gaius Avidius Cassius
Regnal name
- Imperator Caesar Gaius Avidius Cassius Augustus
- Gentes: Cassia; Avidia
- Father: Gaius Avidius Heliodorus
- Mother: Julia Cassia Alexandra
- Occupation: Imperial legate

Gaius Avidius Cassius (c. 130 – July 175 AD) was a Roman general and usurper. He was born in Cyrrhus, and was the son of Gaius Avidius Heliodorus, who served as praefectus or governor of Roman Egypt, and Julia Cassia Alexandra, who was related to a number of royal figures, including her descent from both Augustus and Herod the Great. He began his military career under Antoninus Pius, rising to the status of legatus legionis. He served during the Parthian war of Lucius Verus, in which he distinguished himself, for which he was elevated to the Senate, and later made Imperial legate. During the Bucolic War, he was given the extraordinary title of Rector Orientis, giving him Imperium over all of the eastern provinces of the Roman Empire.

In 175, Cassius declared himself emperor, because he had received news, from Marcus Aurelius' wife Faustina the Younger, that the Emperor Marcus Aurelius was about to die. He received broad support in the eastern provinces of Egypt, Syria, Syria Palaestina and Arabia Petraea, with Egypt being its capital. Despite his control of the vital grain production of Egypt, and his command of seven legions, he was heavily outmatched by Aurelius. While Aurelius was amassing a force to defeat Cassius, a centurion of one of Cassius' legions murdered Cassius, sending his head to Aurelius as proof.

== Early life ==
Avidius Cassius was born around 130, in the town of Cyrrhus, Syria. He was born to Gaius Avidius Heliodorus and Julia Cassia Alexandra. His father, Heliodorus, was of equestrian status, and served as Ab epistulis for Hadrian. Heliodorus later served as Praefectus augustalis, the prefect of Roman Egypt, from 137 to 142 AD. According to Cassius Dio, he received this post, which was one of the highest posts that an equestrian could hold, due to his oratory skills alone. His mother, Julia Cassia, was the great-granddaughter of Junia Lepida, who was herself a great-great-granddaughter of the first Roman emperor, Augustus. She was also a descendant of Herod the Great through her father, Gaius Julius Alexander Berenicianus. Cassius was also a distant descendant of the Roman client-king Antiochus IV Epiphanes of Commagene, who had been dethroned half a century before.

== Early career ==
It is thought that Cassius began his career during the reign of Antoninus Pius. He may have been adlected as a quaestor in 154. It is thought that he became a legatus legionis of one of the legions stationed in Moesia Inferior, which guarded against the Sarmatians, during the late years of Pius' rule (138–161), and it is certain that he was a legatus by at least 161 AD, the last year of Pius' reign.

Cassius rose to prominence rapidly c.164, under the co-emperors Lucius Verus and Marcus Aurelius, during the Parthian war of Lucius Verus, serving as legatus legionis or commander of Legio III Gallica. In 165, he led Legio III Gallica down the Euphrates, and defeated the Parthians at Dura-Europos. Before the end of the year, Cassius and his legion marched to the south, crossed Mesopotamia at its narrowest point, and attacked and sacked the twin Parthian cities of the Tigris river: Seleucia, which was on the right bank; and Ctesiphon, which was on the left bank and was the Parthian capital. After capturing Ctesiphon, he burnt the palace of Vologases IV. Despite the fact that Seleucia had surrendered to the Romans, he destroyed it as well, justifying it by claiming that the local population had broken their agreement.

Cassius' legion was by this time in dire need of supplies. The first signs of what became known as the Antonine Plague showed up in his army in 165. Cassius marched back to Syria, carrying with him the spoils taken from his campaign. He sent details of his campaign to Rome, for which he was rewarded with elevation to the Senate. Much of his success was credited to Emperor Lucius Verus, who, although himself an excellent commander, was notedly unafraid of delegating military tasks to more competent generals.

In May of 166, Cassius was made suffect consul, a position he held while still stationed outside of Rome. During that year, Lucius Verus and Cassius launched a new campaign against the Parthians, invading across the northern stretch of the Tigris river, into Media. During this time, a false rumor reached Rome that Cassius had led Legio III Gallica across the Indus River. In late 166 AD, Cassius was appointed imperial legate of Syria.

In c.170, Cassius was given the extraordinary title of Rector Orientis (literally "Supreme Commander of the Orient"), giving him imperium over the entirety of the eastern section of the empire, in order to combat a large rebellion in Egypt, commonly called the Bucolic War. This rebellion was centered in the area of the Pentapolis of Middle Egypt, and was motivated by a rapid rise of grain prices in the area. The Bucoli (Note: Some sources label them the Bucolic or Boukoloi.) came close to capturing Alexandria, but were halted by Cassius' troops. Cassius succeeded in putting down this revolt in 175, after using a strategy of dividing the various revolting tribespeople, and then conquering them.

== Usurpation ==
In 175, after hearing false reports that Marcus Aurelius had succumbed to his severe illness, Cassius declared himself emperor, claiming that Aurelius' troops in Pannonia, where he had been leading troops as a part of the Marcomannic War, had elected him emperor. Some versions say that Cassius was tricked, or persuaded, by Faustina the Younger, who was the wife of Aurelius, because she feared that Aurelius would die while Commodus, their son, was still young, a situation which would likely have led to a usurper seizing the throne for himself. According to these accounts, Faustina thus tricked, or persuaded, Cassius into rebelling, to ensure the next emperor was someone of her choosing. The exact date of his revolt is unknown, although it is known that he revolted by at least 3 May, due to a document about his emperorship from that date. A papyrus from the Oxyrhynchus Papyri has shown that Cassius was confident of Egyptian support as early as April or even March.

Aurelius attempted to suppress news of the revolt, but, when it became widespread throughout his camp, chose to address it in a speech. The exact wording of his speech is unknown, as the record given by Cassius Dio is believed to be a free composition, which followed only the outline of Aurelius' actual speech. In the record, Aurelius laments the betrayal of a dear friend, and says that if the danger had been to him alone, he would be willing to "set the issue" between himself and Cassius, before the Senate and the Army, and would have yielded the empire to Cassius, if the senate and army considered him the better leader. He was also recorded as saying that he hoped that Cassius would not be killed or commit suicide, so that he could show mercy. The Historia Augusta, a work both treasured by historians and notorious for its falsehoods, records that Aurelius formed a peace commission among his advisors.

Cassius started the rebellion in a good position. He received large support from the Eastern provinces, especially his homeland of Syria, due to a combination of his distant royal descent, his victories in the Parthian War and the Bucolic War. He received support from the provinces of Egypt, Syria, Syria Palaestina and Arabia Petraea, giving him a potential strength of seven legions: three from Syria, two from Syria Palaestina, one from Roman Arabia, and one from Egypt. Cassius set his base of operations in Egypt, with two important bases outside of Egypt being Antioch and Cyrrhus, both important military centres. Gaius Calvisius Statianus, the contemporary prefect of Egypt, issued an edict, which has survived in a fragmentary state, ordering the populace of Egypt to rejoice at the accession of Cassius.

Despite controlling some of the most important parts of the Roman East, especially Egypt which was a critical supplier of grain for the city of Rome, Cassius failed to win widespread support for his rebellion. The Roman Senate swiftly declared Cassius a public enemy, and Publius Martius Verus, the governor of Cappadocia, who staunchly opposed the rebellion, rallied public support for Aurelius. Cassius, through the marriage of his daughter, Avidia Alexandra, to Titius Claudius Dryantianus Antonius, had connection to the Licinnii of Lycia, including Claudius Dryantianus's father Tiberius Claudius Agrippinus, who was a consul. The aristocratic Licinnii are one of the most well known Lycian families. It is unknown how much of a role Claudius Dryantianus played, although it is known that some considered him to be Cassius' partner in crime. Claudius Dryantianus and Avidia Alexandra were pardoned by Marcus Aurelius, although Claudius Dryantianus' estate was confiscated after his death.

Many nobles throughout the empire opposed the rebellion, one example being Herodes Atticus, who is recorded as having sent Cassius a letter containing only the word emanes, literally "you are mad". Despite this widespread opposition, the capital of Rome was thrown into a panic, which forced Aurelius to send Gaius Vettius Sabinianus Julius Hospes, the governor of Pannonia Inferior, with troops to secure the city. Aurelius was forced to withdraw from his campaign against the Iazyges, and end the Marcomannic War. Several barbarian tribes sent offers of their assistance to Aurelius, all of which were refused. Aurelius amassed troops and prepared to depart for the East, to depose Cassius. It was soon clear that Aurelius was in a stronger position, with far more legions available to him than to Cassius. When news of Aurelius' plans to invade reached Egypt, a centurion killed Cassius, and sent his head to Aurelius, who refused to see it, and ordered it buried. He was likely killed by at least the end of July 175, as Egypt chose to recognize Aurelius again on 28 July 175. Cassius had rebelled for three months and six days before being killed, during which time no coins were struck bearing his image.

=== Aftermath ===
After the death of Cassius, Publius Martius Verus swiftly took control of Syria, and burned all of Cassius' correspondences. Even after the news of Cassius' death had reached Marcus Aurelius, Aurelius was still determined to visit the east. He set off with a body of advisors, along with his wife, Faustina, who died along the way, in a village in south Cappadocia, about 20 kilometres (12 mi) south of Tyana, called Halala. The town was renamed in her honor, and his son, Commodus. After the death of Faustina, Aurelius wrote to the Senate, asking them for a report on Cassius' supporters, but specifically saying he desired no bloodshed to punish them, as several retributions had already been carried out in the name of Aurelius. Among these were the killing of Avidius Maecianus, a son of Cassius. Aurelius ordered the banishment of Avidius Heliodorus, another son of Cassius. Avidia Alexandra, the daughter of Cassius, and her husband, were placed under the protection of "an uncle by marriage", believed to be Claudius Titianus, a Lycian senator.

== Personal life ==
Dio spoke highly of Cassius, saying that he was a "good man" whose only fault was that his father, Heliodorus, was given his post of Praefectus augustalis only because of his speaking abilities. He was labelled as being a strict disciplinarian during his time as commander of Legio III Gallica.

Cassius was married to Volusia Vettia Maeciana, daughter of Lucius Volusius Maecianus, and had at least three children (the Historia Augusta implies he may have had more):

- Avidius Heliodorus – first son of Cassius, who was banished by order of the emperor.
- Avidius Maecianus – second son of Cassius, who was killed after the revolt had been put down.
- Avidia Alexandra – daughter of Cassius, who was forced to live under the protection of an uncle, alongside her husband, Titius Claudius Dryantianus Antonius. Avidia and Claudius had four children:
  - Claudius Cassius Agrippinus – he became a senator and was "ad honores admissus." He has been tentatively identified with the Aggrippinus recorded among the Arval Brethren in 213 or 214 AD under Caracalla. (Note: The inscription: CIL VI 2103a — names both "[---A]grippinus" and "C. Sulpici]us Pollio" among those present, the latter being the son of Claudia Ammiana Dryantilla and hence first cousin of Claudius Cassius Agrippinus, as documented in the Oenoanda inscription (IGR III 500), noted by Shelagh Jameson.)
  - Claudia Maeciana Alexandra.
  - Claudia Vettia Agrippina.
  - Claudia Dryantilla Platonis – one of the women who took part in the ludi saeculares of the year 204 AD. She married Cornelius Optatus (or Optatianus), who was either a consul or "adlectus inter consulares."

== Nerva–Antonine family tree ==
Nerva–Antonine family tree

Q. Marcius Barea Soranus	Q. Marcius Barea Sura	Antonia Furnilla	M. Cocceius Nerva	Sergia Plautilla	P. Aelius Hadrianus
Titus (r. 79–81)	Marcia Furnilla	Marcia	Trajanus Pater	Nerva (r. 96–98)	Ulpia (Note: Sister of Trajan's father: Giacosa (1977), p. 7.)	Aelius Hadrianus Marullinus
Flavia (Note: Giacosa (1977), p. 8.)	Marciana (Note: Levick (2014), p. 161.)	C. Salonius Matidius (Note: Husband of Ulpia Marciana: Levick (2014), p. 161.)	Trajan (r. 98–117)	Plotina	P. Acilius Attianus	P. Aelius Afer (Note: Giacosa (1977), p. 7.)	Paulina Major (Note: DIR contributor (Herbert W. Benario, 2000), "Hadrian".)
Lucius Mindius (2)	Libo Rupilius Frugi (3)	Salonia Matidia (Note: Giacosa (1977), p. 9.)	L. Vibius Sabinus (1) (Note: Husband of Salonia Matidia: Levick (2014), p. 161.)
Paulina Minor	L. Julius Ursus Servianus (Note: Smith (1870), "Julius Servianus".)
Matidia Minor	Sabina	Hadrian (Note: Smith (1870), "Hadrian", pp. 319–322.) (r. 117–138)	Antinous (Note: Lover of Hadrian: Lambert (1984), p. 99 and passim; deification: Lamber (1984), pp. 2–5, etc.)
C. Fuscus Salinator I	Julia Serviana Paulina
M. Annius Verus (Note: Husband of Rupilia Faustina: Levick (2014), p. 163.)	Rupilia Faustina (Note: Levick (2014), p. 163.) (Note: It is uncertain whether Rupilia Faustina was Frugi's daughter by Salonia Matidia or another woman.)	Boionia Procilla	Cn. Arrius Antoninus
L. Ceionius Commodus	Appia Severa	C. Fuscus Salinator II
L. Caesennius Paetus	Arria Antonina	Arria Fadilla (Note: Levick (2014), p. 162.)	T. Aurelius Fulvus
L. Caesennius Antoninus	L. Commodus	Plautia	unknown (Note: Levick (2014), p. 164.)	C. Avidius Nigrinus
M. Annius Verus	Calvisia Domitia Lucilla (Note: Wife of M. Annius Verus: Giacosa (1977), p. 10.)	Fundania (Note: Wife of M. Annius Libo: Levick (2014), p. 163.)	M. Annius Libo	Faustina	Antoninus Pius (r. 138–161)	L. Aelius Caesar	Avidia
Cornificia	Marcus Aurelius (r. 161–180) (Note: Giacosa (1977), p. 10.)	Faustina Minor	C. Avidius Cassius (Note: The epitomator of Cassius Dio (72.22) gives the story that Faustina the Elder promised to marry Avidius Cassius. This is also echoed in HA "Marcus Aurelius" 24.)	Aurelia Fadilla	Lucius Verus (r. 161–169) (1)	Ceionia Fabia	Plautius Quintillus (Note: Husband of Ceionia Fabia: Levick (2014), p. 164.)	Q. Servilius Pudens	Ceionia Plautia
Cornificia Minor (Note: Levick (2014), p. 117.)	M. Petronius Sura	Commodus (r. 177–192)	Fadilla	M. Annius Verus Caesar	Ti. Claudius Pompeianus (2)	Lucilla	M. Plautius Quintillus	Junius Licinius Balbus	Servilia Ceionia
Petronius Antoninus	L. Aurelius Agaclytus (2)	Aurelia Sabina	L. Antistius Burrus (1)	Plautius Quintillus	Plautia Servilla	C. Furius Sabinus Timesitheus	Maecia Faustina	Junius Licinius Balbus?
Furia Sabinia Tranquillina	Gordian III (r. 238–244)

- (1) = 1st spouse
- (2) = 2nd spouse
- (3) = 3rd spouse
- Reddish-purple indicates emperor of the Nerva–Antonine dynasty
  lighter purple indicates designated imperial heir of said dynasty who never reigned
  grey indicates unsuccessful imperial aspirants
  bluish-purple indicates emperors of other dynasties
- dashed lines indicate adoption; dotted lines indicate love affairs/unmarried relationships
- Small Caps = posthumously deified (Augusti, Augustae, or other)

Notes:

Except where otherwise noted, the notes below indicate that an individual's parentage is as shown in the above family tree.

References:
- Giacosa, Giorgio (1977). Women of the Caesars: Their Lives and Portraits on Coins. Translated by Holloway, R. Ross. Milan: Edizioni Arte e Moneta. ISBN 0-8390-0193-2.
- Lambert, Royston (1984). Beloved and God: The Story of Hadrian and Antinous. New York: Viking. ISBN 0-670-15708-2.
- Levick, Barbara (2014). Faustina I and II: Imperial Women of the Golden Age. Oxford University Press. ISBN 978-0-19-537941-9.
- Smith, William, ed. (1870). Dictionary of Greek and Roman Biography and Mythology.

== In popular culture ==
- Roman Empire: Reign of Blood
- Gladiator Begins
- 20s A Difficult Age, one of the series' antagonist is based on and named after Cassius.
