= Minicia gens =

Ancient Roman family

The gens Minicia was a plebeian family at ancient Rome. Members of this gens are first mentioned in the first century, achieving the consulate under the emperor Claudius. Owing to the similarity of their names, the Minicii are regularly confused with members of the ancient and far more prominent gens Minucia.

== Origin ==
The Minicii originally came from Brixia in Cisalpine Gaul. That city had received a Roman colony shortly before the Second Punic War, and its inhabitants received Roman citizenship in 41 BC.

== Members ==
This list includes abbreviated praenomina. For an explanation of this practice, see filiation.

- Quintus Minicius Macer, mentioned in an inscription from Brixia.
- Minicius Justus, an intimate friend of Pliny the Younger, was praefectus castrorum for the Legio VII Claudia in AD 69.
- Aulus Minicius Rufus, proconsul of Crete and Cyrenaica, probably in AD 71.
- Minicius Macrinus, an eques from Brixia, was enrolled among those of praetorian rank by the emperor Vespasian.
- Gaius Minicius Italus, a cavalry commander honoured by Vespasian, he subsequently became a provincial governor, and Flamen of the Divine Claudius.
- Aulus Minicius Rufus, proconsul of Creta et Cyrenaica in 71/72.
- Minicius Acilianus, son of Minicius Macrinus and Acilia, is mentioned in the letters of Pliny the Younger. He was a little older than Pliny, and had been quaestor, tribune of the plebs, and praetor.
- Lucius Minicius Rufus, consul in AD 88, during the reign of Domitian.
- Gnaeus Minicius Faustinus, consul suffectus in AD 91.
- Gaius Minicius P. f. Italus, eques and governor of Egypt from AD 100 to 103.
- Lucius Minicius Natalis, consul suffectus in AD 106, and afterward proconsul of Africa.
- Gaius Minicius L. f. Fundanus, consul suffectus in AD 107, and afterward proconsul of Asia.
- (Titus) Salvius T. f. Rufinus Minicius Opimianus, procurator of Asia during the reign of Trajan.
- Gnaeus Minicius Faustinus, consul suffectus in AD 117.
- Titus Salvius (T. f.) T. n. Rufinus Minicius Opimianus, consul suffectus in AD 123, and son of the Opimianus who was procurator of Asia.
- Lucius Minicius L. f. Natalis Quadronius Verus, consul suffectus in AD 139. Like his father before him, he subsequently became proconsul of Africa.
- Minicius Opimianus, the son of Opimianus, consul in 123, was consul suffectus in AD 155.
- Minicius Opimianus, the grandson of Opimianus, the consul of 123, was consul suffectus in AD 186 or 187, and proconsul of Africa at some point between AD 198 and 209. He died in office.

== See also ==
- List of Roman gentes

== Bibliography ==
- Gaius Plinius Caecilius Secundus (Pliny the Younger), Epistulae (Letters).
- Publius Cornelius Tacitus, Historiae.
- Dictionary of Greek and Roman Biography and Mythology, William Smith, ed., Little, Brown and Company, Boston (1849).
- Paul von Rohden, Elimar Klebs, & Hermann Dessau, Prosopographia Imperii Romani (The Prosopography of the Roman Empire, abbreviated PIR), Berlin (1898).
- Werner Eck, "Ergänzungen zu den Fasti Consulares des 1. und 2. Jh. nach Chr." ("Additions to the Fasti Consulares for the First and Second Centuries AD"), in Historia, vol. 24, pp. 324–344 (1975); "Jahres- und Provinzialfasten der senatorischen Statthalter von 69/70 bis 138/139" (Annual and Provincial Fasti of the Senatorial Governors from AD 69/70 to 138/139), in Chiron, vol. 12 (1982).
