= Avidia (mother of Lucius Verus) =

2nd-century Roman noblewoman

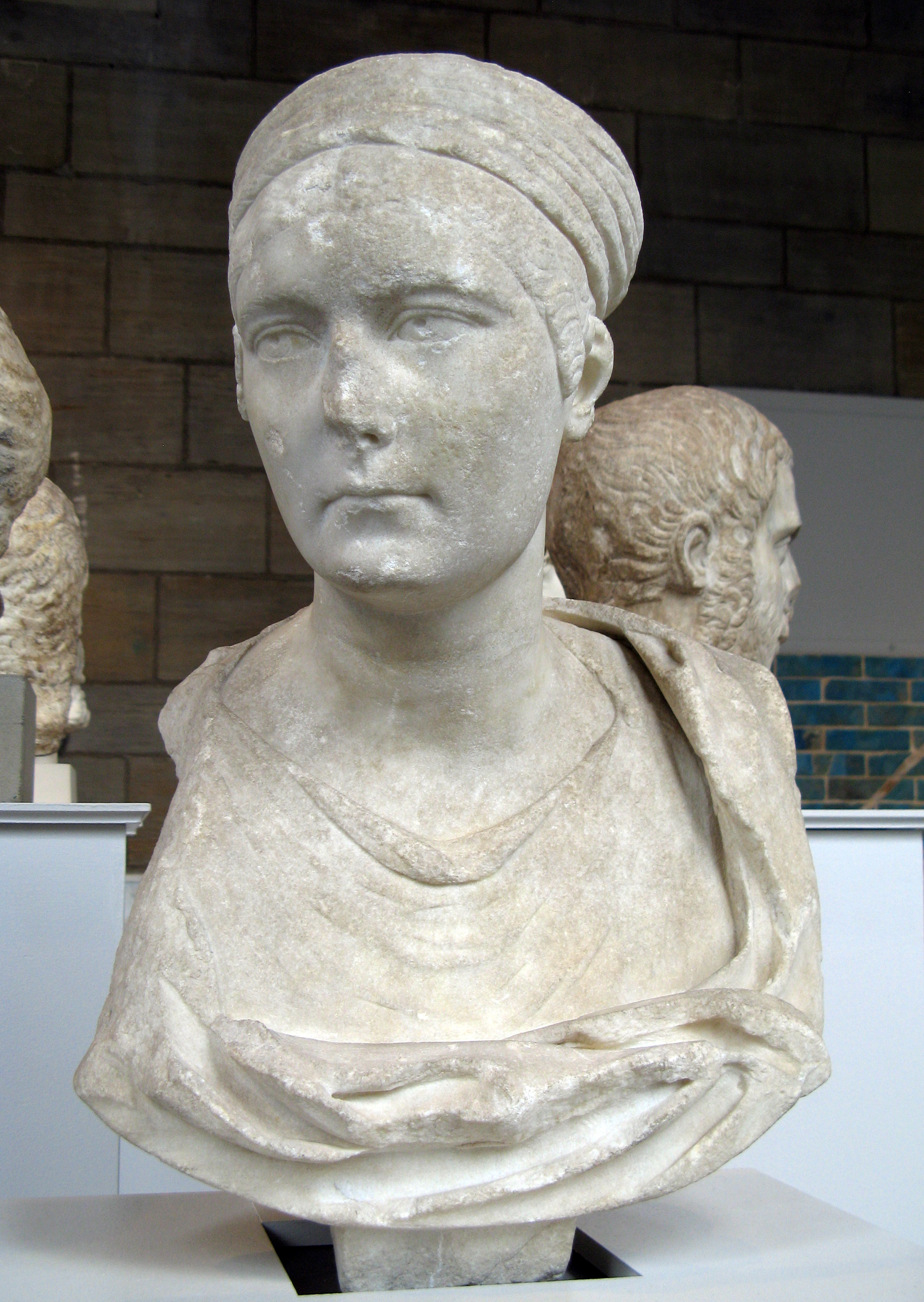
Portrait of Avidia. Ca. 136–138. New Haven, Connecticut, Yale University Art Gallery.

Avidia (flourished 2nd century) was a well-connected noble Roman woman. She is among the lesser known members of the ruling Nerva–Antonine dynasty of the Roman Empire.

== Biography ==
Avidia was the daughter of the well-connected Roman Senator Gaius Avidius Nigrinus and his first wife, whose name is unknown. It is thought that Plautia was her stepmother. Avidia was born and raised in Faventia (modern Faenza, Italy). Her family was distinguished, wealthy and well-connected.

Her family were friends of the Greek historian Plutarch, Roman Senator Pliny the Younger, Roman Emperor Trajan and his family. Her family had strong links to Greece, as her paternal grandfather Gaius Avidius Nigrinus had served at an unknown date during the reign of Roman Emperor Domitian (81-96) as Proconsul of Achaea, a position in which her great-uncle Titus Avidius Quietus had also served. Her family may have been related to the consul Gaius Petronius Pontius Nigrinus, who had served his consulship at the time that the Roman Emperor Tiberius had died in 37.

Avidia's father was executed in 118 on orders from the Roman Senate, because he was one of four senators involved in a failed plot to overthrow the Roman Emperor Hadrian. Sometime after her father's execution, her mother or stepmother may have married another Roman senator.

Before 130 Avidia married the powerful Roman Senator Lucius Aelius Caesar. Aelius was adopted by Roman Emperor Hadrian in 136 as his first heir. Avidia bore Aelius two sons and two daughters who were:

- Lucius Verus – born as Lucius Ceionius Commodus. He would rule as co-Roman Emperor with Marcus Aurelius from 161 until his death in 169. Lucius Verus would marry Lucilla, the second daughter of Marcus Aurelius and Faustina the Younger.
- Gaius Avidius Ceionius Commodus – he is known from an inscription found in Rome.
- Ceionia Fabia – she was 136 engaged to Marcus Aurelius. In 138, when Marcus Aurelius was adopted by Roman Emperor Antoninus Pius, Aurelius ended his engagement to Fabia. Aurelius became engaged to Antoninus Pius’ daughter Faustina the Younger, whom he later married.
- Ceionia Plautia - she married Quintus Servilius Pudens.

In early 138, Aelius died, and Hadrian had adopted Antoninus Pius as his second son and heir. Antoninus was obliged to adopt Marcus Aurelius and Lucius Verus in turn. If Aelius had lived long enough to succeed Hadrian and rule as emperor, Avidia could have been an Empress of Rome.

It is unknown whether Avidia remarried after the death of Aelius. Three existing portrait busts have been identified as Avidia because of physical similarities to the portrait busts of her son Lucius Verus. These busts have been dated to 136–138, when Aelius was the first adopted heir of Hadrian.

When her son reigned as co-Roman Emperor with Marcus Aurelius, Lucius Verus dedicated two honorific inscriptions to his mother. These inscriptions have been found in Rome. The inscriptions honor her as the daughter of Gaius Avidius Nigrinus and the mother of Roman Emperor Lucius Verus. It is unknown whether Avidia lived long enough to see her son co-rule as emperor.

== Nerva–Antonine family tree ==
Nerva–Antonine family tree

Q. Marcius Barea Soranus | Q. Marcius Barea Sura | Antonia Furnilla | M. Cocceius Nerva | Sergia Plautilla | P. Aelius Hadrianus
Titus (r. 79–81) | Marcia Furnilla | Marcia | Trajanus Pater | Nerva (r. 96–98) | Ulpia (Note: Sister of Trajan's father: Giacosa (1977), p. 7.) | Aelius Hadrianus Marullinus
Flavia (Note: Giacosa (1977), p. 8.) | Marciana (Note: Levick (2014), p. 161.) | C. Salonius Matidius (Note: Husband of Ulpia Marciana: Levick (2014), p. 161.) | Trajan (r. 98–117) | Plotina | P. Acilius Attianus | P. Aelius Afer (Note: Giacosa (1977), p. 7.) | Paulina Major (Note: DIR contributor (Herbert W. Benario, 2000), "Hadrian".)
Lucius Mindius (2) | Libo Rupilius Frugi (3) | Salonia Matidia (Note: Giacosa (1977), p. 9.) | L. Vibius Sabinus (1) (Note: Husband of Salonia Matidia: Levick (2014), p. 161.)
Paulina Minor | L. Julius Ursus Servianus (Note: Smith (1870), "Julius Servianus".)
Matidia Minor | Sabina | Hadrian (Note: Smith (1870), "Hadrian", pp. 319–322.) (r. 117–138) | Antinous (Note: Lover of Hadrian: Lambert (1984), p. 99 and passim; deification: Lamber (1984), pp. 2–5, etc.)
C. Fuscus Salinator I | Julia Serviana Paulina
M. Annius Verus (Note: Husband of Rupilia Faustina: Levick (2014), p. 163.) | Rupilia Faustina (Note: Levick (2014), p. 163.) (Note: It is uncertain whether Rupilia Faustina was Frugi's daughter by Salonia Matidia or another woman.) | Boionia Procilla | Cn. Arrius Antoninus
L. Ceionius Commodus | Appia Severa | C. Fuscus Salinator II
L. Caesennius Paetus | Arria Antonina | Arria Fadilla (Note: Levick (2014), p. 162.) | T. Aurelius Fulvus
L. Caesennius Antoninus | L. Commodus | Plautia | unknown (Note: Levick (2014), p. 164.) | C. Avidius Nigrinus
M. Annius Verus | Calvisia Domitia Lucilla (Note: Wife of M. Annius Verus: Giacosa (1977), p. 10.) | Fundania (Note: Wife of M. Annius Libo: Levick (2014), p. 163.) | M. Annius Libo | Faustina | Antoninus Pius (r. 138–161) | L. Aelius Caesar | Avidia
Cornificia | Marcus Aurelius (r. 161–180) (Note: Giacosa (1977), p. 10.) | Faustina Minor | C. Avidius Cassius (Note: The epitomator of Cassius Dio (72.22) gives the story that Faustina the Elder promised to marry Avidius Cassius. This is also echoed in HA "Marcus Aurelius" 24.) | Aurelia Fadilla | Lucius Verus (r. 161–169) (1) | Ceionia Fabia | Plautius Quintillus (Note: Husband of Ceionia Fabia: Levick (2014), p. 164.) | Q. Servilius Pudens | Ceionia Plautia
Cornificia Minor (Note: Levick (2014), p. 117.) | M. Petronius Sura | Commodus (r. 177–192) | Fadilla | M. Annius Verus Caesar | Ti. Claudius Pompeianus (2) | Lucilla | M. Plautius Quintillus | Junius Licinius Balbus | Servilia Ceionia
Petronius Antoninus | L. Aurelius Agaclytus (2) | Aurelia Sabina | L. Antistius Burrus (1) | Plautius Quintillus | Plautia Servilla | C. Furius Sabinus Timesitheus | Maecia Faustina | Junius Licinius Balbus?
Furia Sabinia Tranquillina | Gordian III (r. 238–244)

- (1) = 1st spouse
- (2) = 2nd spouse
- (3) = 3rd spouse
- Reddish-purple indicates emperor of the Nerva–Antonine dynasty
  lighter purple indicates designated imperial heir of said dynasty who never reigned
  grey indicates unsuccessful imperial aspirants
  bluish-purple indicates emperors of other dynasties
- dashed lines indicate adoption; dotted lines indicate love affairs/unmarried relationships
- Small Caps = posthumously deified (Augusti, Augustae, or other)

Notes:

Except where otherwise noted, the notes below indicate that an individual's parentage is as shown in the above family tree.

References:
- Giacosa, Giorgio (1977). Women of the Caesars: Their Lives and Portraits on Coins. Translated by Holloway, R. Ross. Milan: Edizioni Arte e Moneta. ISBN 0-8390-0193-2.
- Lambert, Royston (1984). Beloved and God: The Story of Hadrian and Antinous. New York: Viking. ISBN 0-670-15708-2.
- Levick, Barbara (2014). Faustina I and II: Imperial Women of the Golden Age. Oxford University Press. ISBN 978-0-19-537941-9.
- Smith, William, ed. (1870). Dictionary of Greek and Roman Biography and Mythology.

== Sources ==
- Cassio Dione e l'impero romano da Nerva ad Antonino Pio: alla luce dei nuovi by Guido Migliorati, 2003 – Italian Historical Secondary Source
- The Cambridge ancient history, Volume 11 By Alan K. Bowman, Peter Garnsey, Dominic Rathbone Limited preview - Edition: 2 - Item notes: v. 11 – 2000
- Plutarch's Sertorius: A Historical Commentary. C. Konrad Chapel Hill: University of North Carolina Press, 1994
- Marcus Aurelius, by Anthony Richard Birley, Routledge, 2000
- A dictionary of the Roman Empire By Matthew Bunson – 1995
- roman-emperors.org
- http://ancientrome.ru/art/artworken/img.htm?id=2762.
- https://web.archive.org/web/20110720122702/http://ecatalogue.art.yale.edu/detail.htm?objectId=7368
- http://penelope.uchicago.edu/Thayer/E/Roman/Texts/Historia_Augusta/Aelius*.html#2.8
- http://penelope.uchicago.edu/Thayer/E/Roman/Texts/Historia_Augusta/Lucius_Verus*.html
