= Avidia gens =

Ancient Roman family

The gens Avidia was an ancient Roman family that flourished during the early centuries of the Empire. Several of its members rose to prominence during the late first and second centuries AD.

== Branches and cognomina ==
Two branches of this family appeared towards the end of the first century. They were descended from two brothers, who bore the surnames Quietus, meaning "calm" or "peaceful", and Nigrinus, a diminutive of niger, meaning "blackish".

== Members ==
This list includes abbreviated praenomina. For an explanation of this practice, see filiation.

- Titus Avidius Quietus, a friend and contemporary of Pliny the Younger, whom he supported in his accusation of Publicius Certus in AD 96.
- Titus Avidius Quietus, consul suffectus in AD 111.
- Gaius Avidius Nigrinus, proconsul during the reign of Domitian, and brother of the elder Quietus; Plutarch dedicated a treatise on brotherly love to them.
- Gaius Avidius C. f. Nigrinus, consul suffectus during the first half of AD 110; one of four senators put to death in the year following the accession of Hadrian.
- Avidia C. f. C. n., the daughter of Nigrinus, married Lucius Aelius, Hadrian's heir; her son, Lucius Verus, was adopted by Antoninus Pius, and was emperor with Marcus Aurelius from AD 161 to 169.
- Gaius Avidius Heliodorus, a rhetorician, and native of Syria, who became a private secretary and friend of Hadrian; he was appointed praefectus of Egypt.
- Gaius Avidius C. f. Cassius, son of Heliodorus, and a successful general under Marcus Aurelius, against whom he rebelled in AD 175.
- Avidius Maecianus, son of Avidius Cassius, entrusted with the command of Alexandria during his father's rebellion; he was slain by his own soldiers.

== See also ==
- List of Roman gentes
