= Titus Prifernius Geminus =

Roman senator

Titus Prifernius Geminus (full name Titus Prifernius Paetus Rosianus Geminus) was a Roman senator who lived in the second century. He is best known as a friend and correspondent of Pliny the Younger, who addresses him as Geminus; he served as quaestor to Pliny for the latter's consulship in AD 100, and five letters Pliny wrote to Geminus have survived. Although the letters convey a genuine friendship between the two (VII.1 mentions Geminus' illness), the first one appears only in the latter books of Pliny's collection; Ronald Syme explains this may be due to the fact that he, like Quintus Corellius Rufus and Calestrius Tiro, were living in Rome at the same time.

According to an inscription found at Patrae, the praenomen of Rosianus Geminus's father was "Sextus". Because Sextii Prifernii are not otherwise attested, Olli Salomies, in his monograph on the naming practices of the Early Roman empire, considers it "almost a certainty" that Geminus' name at birth was Rosius Sex.f. Geminus, and he was adopted by testament by a Titus Prifernius Paetus. This person has been identified with Titus Prifernius Paetus, suffect consul in 96, as well as the equestrian Titus Prifernius Paetus Memmius Apollinaris.

== Career ==
A military diploma, dated 16 June 123, attests that Geminus was suffect consul with Publius Metilius Secundus that year. Prior to the publication of this military diploma, Geminus was known to have been proconsular governor of Africa in 140/141; inferences from that date had led experts to date his consulate earlier than 127, since all of the consuls for 127 and 128 were known.

Other offices of his career are known. Geminus was propraetorian governor of the public province of Achaea in 122/123; an inscription found at Cirta attests that his son-in-law Publius Pactumeius Clemens was his legatus or assistant during his year governing Achaea, which also attests Clemens served as his assistant much later when Geminus was governor of Africa. Later Geminus was appointed governor of the imperial province of Cappadocia. Geminus' name also appears in a number of inscriptions listing the names of the patrons of Ostia, along with his son Titus Prifernius Paetus Rosianus Geminus, the suffect consul of 146.

Political offices
Preceded by Quintus Articuleius Paetinus, and Lucius Venuleius Apronianus Octavius Priscus as ordinary consuls	Suffect consul of the Roman Empire; AD 123 with Publius Metilius Secundus	Succeeded by Titus Salvius Rufinus Minicius Opimianus, and Gnaeus Sentius Aburnianus as suffect consuls
