= Publius Coelius Balbinus Vibullius Pius =

2nd century Roman senator, consul and governor

Publius Coelius Balbinus Vibullius Pius was a Roman senator active during the first half of the second century AD. He was consul for 137 as the colleague of Lucius Aelius. Balbinus is known only from non-literary sources, where he is usually referred to by the short form of his name, Publius Coelius Balbinus.

Olli Salomies speculates that Balbinus came from Hispania, and notes that Ronald Syme has suggested that the elements "Vibullius Pius" in Balbinus' name came from his mother. Salomies further suggests that Balbinus was the son of Publius Coelius Apollinaris, consul in 111, and the father of Publius Coelius Apollinaris, consul in 169.

The cursus honorum of Balbinus up to his consulate is known from an inscription reported from Rome. He began his career as one of the decemviri stlitibus judicandis, one of the four boards that form the vigintiviri; membership in one of these four boards was a preliminary and required first step toward gaining entry into the Roman Senate. He served as sevir equitum Romanorum, then was military tribune with the Legio XXII Primigenia, then stationed in Germania Superior at Mogontiacum. Once he had returned from his posting on the Rhine frontier, Balbinus would have become a quaestor, which would have enrolled him in the Roman Senate, but instead the emperor Hadrian first adlected him into the Patrician class; if the order of the offices he held on the inscription reflects the order of the offices he held, both this, and his admission to the salii Collinus also came before he was quaestor to emperor Hadrian. Becoming a Patrician excused him from the traditional Republican magistracies between quaestor and praetor. His consulate followed.

The only consular post Balbinus is known to have held was governor of Dalmatia, according to Werner Eck's interpretation of an inscription found at Salona; Eck dates the period he held this posting simply as "after 137". The rest of Balbinus' life is a blank.

Political offices
Preceded by Lucius Aelius, and Sextus Vettulenus Civica Pompeianus as Ordinary consuls	Consul of the Roman Empire; 137 with Lucius Aelius II	Succeeded by Kanus Junius Niger, and Gaius Pomponius Camerinus as Ordinary consuls
