= Titus Salvius Rufinus Minicius Opimianus =

Roman senator who was suffect consul in 123

Titus Salvius Rufinus Minicius Opimianus was a Roman senator of the second century. He is known to have served as suffect consul in 123 with Gnaeus Sentius Aburnianus as his colleague. He is also attested as proconsul of Africa in 138/139.

In discussing the inscription on a marble ara found in Ratiaria, a city in the Roman province of Upper Moesia, Ivo Topalilov identifies the Titus Minicius Opimianus who dedicated the ara to the goddess Diana with this senator, and based on the letter forms of the inscription he dates Opimianus' tenure between the years 126 and 129/130. Topalilov notes that "it is very likely that he might have also held another governorship" between the governorship of Moesia and proconsulship of Africa.

The origins of his family are not certain. Although it is clear his family came from Italia, Werner Eck suggests that they came from the town of Tusculum in the Alban Hills, noting that his tribe Papira had members from the area, that Opimianus and his wife were buried there, and that inscriptions bearing the family name have been found there. Further, Eck reconstructs a genealogy for Opimianus that provides him with a father, (Titus?) Salvius Rufinus Minicius Opimianus, who was procurator of Asia during Trajan's rule, a son, Minicius Opimianus, suffect consul in 155, and a grandson, Minicius Opimianus, who was suffect consul in either 186 or 187, then proconsul of Africa in 202/203.

Political offices
| Preceded by Titus Prifernius Geminus, and Publius Metilius Secundus as suffect consuls | Suffect consul of the Roman Empire; AD 123 with Gnaeus Sentius Aburnianus | Succeeded by Manius Acilius Glabrio, and Gaius Bellicius Flaccus Torquatus Tebanianus as ordinary consuls |
