= Marcus Metilius Aquillius Regulus =

2nd century Roman senator and consul

Marcus Metilius Aquillius Regulus (his recorded full name is Marcus Metilius Aquillius Regulus Nepos Volusius Torquatus Fronto) was a Roman senator of the second century AD. A member of the patrician order, he held the office of consul ordinarius in 157 with another patrician, Marcus Vettulenus Civica Barbarus, as his colleague.

The Metilii were an Italian family, likely from Transpadana. Regulus himself was the son of Publius Metilius Secundus, suffect consul in 123. Olli Salomies, in his study of the naming practices of the first centuries of the Roman Empire, notes that it "seems plausible enough" to infer his mother was a member of the gens Aquillia, and suggests that his praenomen was inherited from that side of the family.

His career began in his teens with the Vigintiviri, as one of the tresviri monetalis; assignment to this board was usually allocated to patricians or favored individuals. This was followed at 25 by a posting as quaestor, then at 30 as praetor. By the age of 32 or 33 Regulus was appointed consul, the usual age for patricians. Regulus is known to have held the priestly offices in the sodales Flaviales, the Salii collini, and in the collegium of augurs.

Political offices
Preceded by Quintus Canusius Praenestinus; Gaius Lusius Sparsus as suffecti	Roman consul 157 with Marcus Vettulenus Civica Barbarus	Succeeded by Lucius Roscius Aelianus; Gnaeus Papirius Aelianus as suffecti
