= Lucius Valerius Proculus =

Roman governor of Roman Egypt and eques

Lucius Valerius Proculus was a Roman eques who held a number of military and civil appointments during the reigns of the Emperors Hadrian and Marcus Aurelius. He is known primarily from inscriptions and non-literary papyrus.

The career of Valerius Proculus is documented in an inscription recovered from Málaga in Spain. His earliest imperial appointments conform to the steps in the tres militiae. First was a commission as praefectus or commander of cohors IV Tracum in Syria. Then he was commissioned a military tribune in Legio VII Claudia. It is likely his commission with the VII Claudia coincided with that of his brother, Gaius Valerius Florinum; Dessau argues for this relationship based on the shared praenomen of their fathers (Lucius) and tribe (Quirina). Proculus then was appointed prefect of the Classis Alexandriae et Potamophylaciae—a combined command of the Roman fleet based at Alexandria, and the officials who policed the Nile and collected customs.

At this point the civil track of his career begins. First Proculus was appointed procurator or governor of the province of Alpes Maritimae. After being given the task of military recruitment in an unknown province (the inscription is broken here), he went to serve as procurator, or overseer of imperial estates, in these provinces: Baetica, Cappadocia, Asia, and the Three Gauls.

Proculus then advanced to two senior appointments. First was as praefectus annonae, or overseer of the grain supply of Rome; he held this position from 142 to 144. The second was the related but more prestigious post of prefect or governor of Roman Egypt, which he held from 144 to 147.

Apparently after concluding his service in Egypt, Valerius Proculus retired to Málaga, for the inscription that details his career was set up to honor him and his wife Valeria Lucilla as civic patrons.

Political offices
Preceded by Gaius Valerius Eudaemon	Prefectus of Aegyptus; 144-147	Succeeded by Marcus Petronius Honoratus
