= Marcus Petronius Honoratus =

Roman eques and governor of Roman Egypt

Marcus Petronius Honoratus was a Roman eques who held a number of military and civilian positions during the reigns of the Emperors Hadrian and Antoninus Pius, which included praefectus annonae and praefectus or governor of Roman Egypt.

== Life ==
His career is documented in an inscription found at Rome, which was erected by negotiatores ole[ari] ex Baetica, or oil merchants from Baetica, which was one of the most important sources of quality oil; this group had chosen Petronius Honoratus as their patron. His career began with the tres militiae: first as prefect or commander of Cohors I Raetorum, which was stationed at the time in Germania Inferior, followed by military tribune with Legio I Minervia also stationed in Germania Inferior, and lastly as prefect of ala II Thracum Augusta pia fidelis, which was stationed in Mauretania Caesariensis. This concluded his military career.

At this point Honoratus began his civilian career, probably after the beginning of the reign of Antoninus Pius. He became procurator monetae, or head of the imperial mint, which received an annual income of 100,000 sesterces. He advanced to procurator of the vicesima hereditatium, or overseer of the collection of the 5% inheritance tax, which received an annual income of 200,000 sesterces. This was followed with the appointment as procurator of the imperial properties in the provinces of Gallia Belgica and the two German provinces. Henriette Pavis d'Escurac notes Honoratus advanced to this posting without holding any governmental procuratorships, which is unusual: she compares his career to another eques, Gaius Junius Flavianus, was governor of Alpes Maritimes before advancing to procurator of imperial properties in Asturia and Galicia.

Here Honoratus received a series of appointments to senior equestrian positions. D'Escurac agrees with Hans-Georg Pflaum's suggestion that the rapidity of his brilliant career may be partly explained by his kinship with Marcus Petronius Mamertinus, who was suffect consul in 150 AD and governor of Egypt several years before Honoratus. Honoratus returned to Rome to serve as procurator a rationibus, or head of the accounting section, and remained in Rome as annonae praefectus, or overseer of the grain supply for the capital city. Then he was appointed praefectus or governor of Egypt from 147 to 148 AD; several primary sources attest to his presence there from August 29, 147 to November 11, 148 AD, and because his successor is not attested before 150, Honoratus could have remained in office through 149 AD.

His presence as annonae praefectus therefore is placed before 147. He assumed this post as the immediate successor of Lucius Valerius Proculus, who held the office from 144 to 146; d'Escurac notes Petronius Honoratus was also the immediate successor of Proculus in Egypt.

Political offices
Preceded by Lucius Valerius Proculus	Prefectus of Aegyptus; 147-148	Succeeded by Lucius Munatius Felix
