= Publius Metilius Secundus =

2nd century Roman senator and soldier

Publius Metilius Secundus was a Roman senator, who was active during the reign of Hadrian. He was suffect consul in one of the earlier nundinia of 123 as the colleague of Titus Prifernius Geminus. He is known entirely from inscriptions.

Based on his filiation, Secundus may be the son of Publius Metilius Nepos, suffect consul in 103. It is more certain that he was the father of Marcus Metilius Aquillius Regulus, consul ordinarius in 157.

== Career ==
A partly damaged inscription from Alsium in Etruria provides us the details of his cursus honorum. The last two surviving letters on the last line of this inscription, tr[...], have been restored to read tri[umviro a(ere) a(rgento) a(uro) f(lando) f(eriundo)], or the office of tresviri monetalis, the most prestigious of the four boards that comprise the vigintiviri; assignment to this board was usually allocated to patricians or favored individuals. However, another possible restoration produces the reading tr[ibuno mil] or military tribune of an unknown unit. Either restoration is equally possible. His next known appointment was as military tribune with Legio VII Gemina; multiple commissions as military tribune, although uncommon, were not unprecedented. This was followed by the sevir equitum Romanorum of the annual review of the equites at Rome. Then Secundus was elected to the office of quaestor, and upon completion of this traditional Republican magistracy he would be enrolled in the Senate. The traditional Republican magistracies of plebeian tribune and praetor followed.

After he completed his duties as praetor, Secundus was admitted to the Fratres arvales, an ancient collegium revived by Augustus a century before. Secundus is attested as serving as magister in the year 117; the Acta Arvalia records his appearance at their rituals in January 118 and May 124. At the same time he was commissioned legatus legionis or commander of Legio XI Claudia, then stationed at Durostorum (modern Silistra). This was followed by a second commission as legatus of Legio III Augusta, then stationed in Theveste (present day Tébessa) in North Africa; the unit may have relocated to Lambaesis while he was commander. Werner Eck estimates his commission ran from the year 120 to 123, when he returned to Rome to accede to his consulate.

Only one office after his consulship is known for Secundus, attested by the inscription from Alsiensis: curator operum locorumque publiorum, or overseer of the public works and places. His life after this point is a blank.

Political offices
Preceded by Quintus Articuleius Paetinus, and Lucius Venuleius Apronianus Octavius Priscus as ordinary consuls	Suffect consul of the Roman Empire; 123 with Titus Prifernius Geminus	Succeeded by Titus Salvius Rufinus Minicius Opimianus, and Gnaeus Sentius Aburnianus as suffect consuls
