= Lucius Minicius Natalis =

2nd century Roman senator, official and military leader

Lucius Minicius Natalis was a Roman senator and military leader who occupied a number of offices in the imperial service. He was suffect consul in 106 with Quintus Licinius Silvanus Granianus Quadronius Proculus as his colleague. He is known entirely from inscriptions.

== Career ==
An inscription found in Barcelona provides details of his cursus honorum. Natalis began his career as a member of the quattuorviri viarum curandarum, one of the four boards that comprised the vigintiviri; serving as one of these minor magistracies was considered an important first step in a senator's career. This board oversaw road maintenance within the city of Rome. Although Natalis certainly held the office of quaestor, which enrolled him in the senate, his next documented office was as plebeian tribune, followed by serving as legate, or assistant, to the proconsular governor of Africa. He participated in the Dacian Wars, and for his heroism received dona militaria, or military decorations. Afterwards Natalis was appointed legatus legionis or commander of the Legio III Augusta, effectively making him praetorian governor of Numidia in 103/104.

The inscription from Barcelona attests that following his consulate, Natalis was appointed curator alvei Tiberis et riparum et cloacarum, or one of the officials responsible for public works inside the city, regulating the Tiber and the maintenance of Rome's sanitation system. Next he was governor of Pannonia Superior, and after being inducted into the sodalis Augustalis, Natalis was proconsul of Africa in 121/122. His son, Lucius Minicius Natalis Quadronius Verus, served as his legatus, or assistant, during his tenure in Africa.

His life after he concluded his governorship in Africa is a blank.

Political offices
Preceded by Lucius Ceionius Commodus, and Sextus Vettulenus Civica Cerialis as Ordinary consuls	Suffect consul of the Roman Empire; 106 with Quintus Licinius Silvanus Granianus Quadronius Proculus	Succeeded by Lucius Licinius Sura III, and Quintus Sosius Senecio II as Suffect consuls
