= Sextus Vettulenus Civica Cerialis =

Early second century Roman senator

Sextus Vettulenus Civica Cerialis was a Roman senator of the early second century. He was ordinary consul in AD 106 as the colleague of Lucius Ceionius Commodus. No further details of his career are attested.

Cerialis is considered the son of Sextus Vettulenus Cerialis, general and suffect consul in either 72 or 73. The younger Cerialis was married twice. By his first wife, whose name is not known, he had at least one son, Sextus Vettulenus Civica Pompeianus, consul in 136. By his second wife, whose name has been surmised as Plautia, Cerialis had another son, Marcus Vettulenus Civica Barbarus, consul in 157.

Political offices
| Preceded by Marcus Vitorius Marcellus, and Gaius Caecilius Strabo as Suffect consuls | Consul of the Roman Empire; 106 with Lucius Ceionius Commodus | Succeeded by Lucius Minicius Natalis, and Quintus Licinius Silvanus Granianus Quadronius Proculus as Suffect consuls |
