= Gaius Valerius Eudaemon =

Roman governor of Egypt from 142 to 143 AD

Prefect (governor) of Roman Egypt
- In office 142–143

Personal details
- Died: Unknown (possibly mentioned by Marcus Aurelius among admired deceased individuals)
- Known for: Close confidant of Emperor Hadrian; career spanning key imperial administrative posts

Gaius Valerius Eudaemon was a Roman eques who held a number of military and civilian positions during the reigns of the Emperors Hadrian and Antoninus Pius, which includes praefectus of Roman Egypt. He is known as a close friend of the emperor Hadrian.

His career is documented in two inscriptions. One is in Latin from Ephesus, erected by an imperial freedman named Hermes. The name of the subject is missing, but from the other inscription, erected in Syria and written in Greek, Eudaemon is confirmed as the subject.

The date of his death is not known, although he may be the same Eudaemon Marcus Aurelius mentions in a list of dead men he looked up to, along with Demetrius and Aulus Claudius Charax.

== Career ==
Eudaemon first appears in history when Hadrian appointed him procurator Caesar Trajani Hadriani Augusti ad diocesin Alexandriae, or "procurator of Emperor Hadrian for the administration of Alexandria". Anthony Birley provides context for this, placing the appointment at the time Hadrian was proclaimed emperor; Birley is certain that Eudaemon was present at the occasion (August 117), noting that Historia Augusta describes Eudaemon as conscius imperii, Hadrian's "accomplice in attaining the throne". "Eudaemon was evidently dispatched almost at once to Egypt", Birley writes, given a minor posting "to keep an eye on things there." Birley speculates that he arrived with a letter of dismissal for the current prefect, Marcus Rutilius Lupus.

Birley further speculates that Eudaemon also encouraged Hadrian "to issue an edict confirming the privileges to philosophers, rhetors, grammatici, and doctors granted by Vespasian and Trajan."

His next recorded appointment was to manage the Greek and Latin libraries at Rome. This was followed by the ab epistulis graecis, or overseer of the Emperor's Greek correspondence; Birley dates this to 126 or 127, after the emperor had returned to Italy and found himself busy attending to the petitions of the cities of Greece.

Further appointments followed. Eudaemon held a procuratorship in Asia Minor comprising Lycia, Pamphylia, Galatia, Paphlagonia, Pisidia and Pontus, with a salary of over 100,000 sesterces. Then followed procurator hereditatium and procurator provinciae Asiae. This is an abnormal combination of two appointments, the first concerning Rome and the second in the provinces; Henriette Pavis d'Escurac explains this combination with the supposition that Hadrian took Eudaemon with him on his travels in the East. Eudaemon then became procurator Syriae, probably when Hadrian spent the winter of 129/130 in Antioch. The Greek inscription allows us to add more two posts to the career of Valerius Eudaemon, which includes a palatine secretariat.

The Historia Augusta notes that Hadrian turned against many of his friendships by the last years of his reign, providing a list of names that includes Eudaemon, whom Hadrian "reduced to poverty." However, after a space of several years Antoninus Pius rehabilitated him. We know that Eudaemon was appointed governor of Egypt, which he held from 142 to 143. Beginning with Arthur Stein and Hans-Georg Pflaum, it has been assumed he was appointed to one of these other two prefectures first: praefectus vigilum or praefectus annonae. Pavis d'Escurac believes it was more appropriate that Eudaemon was praefectus annonae, the immediate predecessor of Lucius Valerius Proculus.

His primary concern as governor of Egypt was to safeguard the harvest and delivery of grain to the populace of Rome, but surviving letters from his administration show his responsibilities extended further. One concerns his investigation and grant of immunity from liturgy to a doctor who mummified corpses. Another also concerns the liturgy: in it Valerius Eudaemon berates a village clerk for nominating a man to this responsibility, who was too poor to handle this responsibility, and as a result fled his farm and home.

Political offices
Preceded by Gaius Avidius Heliodorus	Prefectus of Aegyptus; 142-143	Succeeded by Lucius Valerius Proculus
