= Quartinia gens =

The gens Quartinia was an obscure plebeian family at ancient Rome. Few members of this gens are mentioned in history, but a number are known from inscriptions.

== Origin ==
The nomen Quartinius belongs to a class of gentilicia formed from other names, typically ending in -inus, suggesting the cognomen Quartinus, a diminutive of Quartus, fourth. Quartus may have been an old praenomen that had fallen out of use by historical times, but continued in use as a cognomen. The feminine form, Quarta, was regularly used as both praenomen and cognomen.

The greater number of Quartinii are known from inscriptions from various parts of Gaul, and other northern provinces, suggesting that the family was of Gallic origin. At least two of them were associated with the temple of Mithras at Virunum in Noricum, one in the late second century, the other early in the fourth, indicating the family's long residence there.

== Praenomina ==
The only praenomina associated with the Quartinii are Lucius, Marcus, and Titus, all of which were among the most common names throughout Roman history.

== Members ==
This list includes abbreviated praenomina. For an explanation of this practice, see filiation.

- Quartinius Castresus, son of Quartinius Optatus, buried in the family sepulchre at Rome, aged seven years, one month, twenty-seven days.
- Quartinia T. f. Catullina, dedicated a tomb at Salinae in Alpes Maritimae for her parents, Titus Quartinius Catullinus and Lucillia Materna, and brother, Quartinius Maternus.
- Titus Quartinius Catullinus, husband of Lucillia Materna, and father of Quartinius Maternus and Quartinia Catullina, buried at Salinae.
- Quartinius T. f. Maternus, son of Titus Quartinius Catullinus and Lucillia Materna, was a soldier in the fourteenth urban cohort, buried at Salinae in a tomb dedicated by his sister, Quartinia Catullina.
- Quartinia Mitani, wife of Aurelius Primitivus Cularo, named in an inscription from Gratianopolis in Gallia Narbonensis.
- Quartinius Optatus, a veteran, built a sepulchre at Rome for himself, his son, Quartinius Castresus, and Flavia Myrtala, perhaps his wife.
- Quartinia Paterna, wife of Marcus Mogovius Bredo, who dedicated a tomb for her at Nemausus in Gallia Narbonensis.
- Marcus Quartinius Paternus, the son of Avitianus, named in a libationary inscription from Brigantio in Alpes Maritimae.
- Lucius Quartinius Primus, named in an inscription found at Riva del Garda, formerly in Venetia and Histria.
- Lucius Quartinius Quartus, named in a dedicatory inscription from the temple of Mithras at Virunum, dating between AD 182 and 184.
- Marcus Quartinius M. f. Sabinus Remus, a soldier in the praetorian guard, named in a libationary inscription from Rome.
- Titus Quartinius Saturnalis, standard-bearer of the thirtieth legion, named in a libationary inscription from Colonia Ulpia Trajana in Germania Inferior, dating to AD 239.
- Quartinius Tacitus, named in an inscription from Rome.
- Quartinius Ursinianus, curator of the temple of Mithras at Virunum, after its restoration in AD 311.
- Quartinia Virana, named in a libationary inscription found at Fino Mornasco, formerly part of Cisalpine Gaul.

== See also ==
- List of Roman gentes

== Bibliography ==
- Theodor Mommsen et alii, Corpus Inscriptionum Latinarum (The Body of Latin Inscriptions, abbreviated CIL), Berlin-Brandenburgische Akademie der Wissenschaften (1853–present).
- René Cagnat et alii, L'Année épigraphique (The Year in Epigraphy, abbreviated AE), Presses Universitaires de France (1888–present).
- George Davis Chase, "The Origin of Roman Praenomina", in Harvard Studies in Classical Philology, vol. VIII (1897).
- Hans Petersen, "The Numeral Praenomina of the Romans", in Transactions of the American Philological Association, vol. xciii, pp. 347–354 (1962).
