= Sextus Quintilius Valerius Maximus =

2nd century Roman consul and senator

Sextus Quintilius Valerius Maximus was a Roman politician and senator in the second century AD.

== Biography ==
Born in Alexandria Troas, Quintilius Valerius Maximus and his brother Sextus Quintilius Condianus were members of gens Quintilia. The brothers served together as consuls in 151 AD. In 168 AD, Valerius Maximus served as proconsul of Asia. The brothers were well educated and authored a treatise in the Greek language on farming, called Georgica. The brothers were killed in 182 on the orders of Commodus who had coveted their great Villa of the Quintilii which he then confiscated. His son, Sextus Quintilius Condianus, served as consul in 180.
