= Gaius Avidius Heliodorus =

2nd century Roman politician and prefect of Egypt

Gaius Avidius Heliodorus (c. 100 – aft. 142) was an eques and noted orator who held at least two important appointments during the reigns of Hadrian and Antoninus Pius.

== Life ==
He was of Ancient Egyptian or Greek origin and became ab epistulis under Hadrian, and later prefect of Egypt between 137 and 142. According to the Historia Augusta, Heliodorus drew the wrath of emperor Hadrian, who attacked him in a notorious letter. Nevertheless, he remained prefect of Egypt for several years under Hadrian's successor, Antoninus Pius.

Heliodorus married Julia Cassia Alexandra, princess of Judaea; she was the daughter of Gaius Julius Alexander Berenicianus and Cassia Lepida, a descendant of Cassius and Augustus. Their son was the usurper Avidius Cassius.

Political offices
Preceded by Marcus Petronius Mamertinus	Prefect of Egypt; 137–142	Succeeded by Gaius Valerius Eudaemon
