= Marcus Petronius Mamertinus =

2nd century Roman senator, governor and praetorian prefect

Marcus Petronius Mamertinus, possibly known as Sextus Petronius Mamertinus, was a Roman senator originally of the Equestrian order. He served as suffect consul in 150 AD as the colleague of Marcus Cassius Apollinaris.

Edward Champlin has argued that Petronius Mamertinus is a kinsman of the orator Fronto, based on a letter Fronto wrote to Petronius, commending a young man to him, in which Fronto addresses Petronius as a member of "our familia". Champlin writes, "There can be no doubt that here, as elsewhere, familia means precisely family to Fronto." Anthony Birley notes this supports his earlier argument that Petronius had an African origin, and further argues that his postulated wife, Septimia, was a cousin of the future emperor Septimius Severus. On the other hand, Géza Alföldy suggested Petronius had an Italian background, where the cognomen Mamertinus is most common.

== Career ==
Petronius served as praefectus or governor of Egypt during the reign of Hadrian from 133 to 137. His primary concern as governor of Egypt was to safeguard the harvest and delivery of grain to the populace of Rome, but surviving letters from his administration show his responsibilities extended further. In one edict surviving from his tenure, Petronius bans strategi and the official scribes from authorizing travellers without official warrants to requisition boats and animals for their own use. A second surviving letter concerns his circuit court: that he had planned to go upriver beyond Koptos, but a lack of time forced him to follow his usual practice of only holding sessions in the Thebaid and the Heptanomia. A third addresses the strategos of the Thinite nome, to cease his harassment of the new inhabitants of Antinoöpolis. A fourth relays a decision from Hadrian, acknowledging that for two consecutive years (134 and 135) the Nile failed to inundate the farmlands as needed, and granting a deference in paying the tax.

Graffiti inscribed on the Colossi of Memnon records that Petronius was present at dawn of 10 March 134 to hear the statues sing. He may have been accompanied by Quintus Marcius Hermogenes, then prefect of the classis Augustae Alexandrinae; Hermogenes left graffiti dated to the same year attesting he had also heard the statues.

Under Antoninus Pius, he advanced to the office of Praetorian prefect in Rome holding it from 139 to 143. He must have distinguished himself, for Antoninus Pius adlected him to Senatorial rank, which led to Petronius becoming consul.

== Family ==
He and Septimia had two sons: Marcus Petronius Sura Mamertinus, ordinary consul in 182, who married one of the daughters of emperor Marcus Aurelius, an unnamed daughter, who married Marcus Antoninus Antius Lupus; and Marcus Petronius Sura Septimianus ordinary consul in 190.

Political offices
Preceded by Titus Flavius Titianus	Prefect of Egypt; 133–137	Succeeded by Gaius Avidius Heliodorus
Preceded by [...]mus, and Gaius Laberius Priscus as suffect consuls	Roman consul 150 (suffect) with Marcus Cassius Apollinaris	Succeeded by Gaius Curtius Justus; Gaius Julius Julianus as ordinary consuls
