= Ceionia gens =

Families in ancient Rome

The gens Ceionia or gens Caeionia or the Caeionii family was an ancient Roman senatorial family of imperial times. The first member of the gens to obtain the consulship was Lucius Ceionius Commodus in AD 78. The rise of this family culminated in the elevation of the emperor Lucius Verus, born Lucius Ceionius Commodus, in AD 161.

== Origin ==
The Ceionii were probably of Etruscan origin. Their nomen resembles other Etruscan names, such as Cilnius, and the family does not appear in history before the first century. The historian Aelius Spartianus wrote that they came from Etruria, or perhaps from the town of Faventia, which was itself of Etruscan origin.

== Praenomina ==
The praenomina used by the Ceionii were Lucius, Gaius, and Marcus.

== Branches and cognomina ==
The most illustrious family of the Ceionii bore the cognomen Commodus, meaning "friendly, obliging," or "pleasant." The agnomen Verus, meaning "true", was borne by some members of this family. Many other surnames occur, some of which were ordinary cognomina, such as Rufus, meaning "red" or "reddish," or Bassus, "stout". However, as with many families of imperial times, many surnames were acquired from other families to whom the Ceionii were related or otherwise politically connected.

Postumus, a surname belonging to the father of the emperor Albinus, is derived from the praenomen Postumus, referring to a youngest child, although a popular false etymology derived it from post humus, "after burial", meaning a child born after his father's death. In a letter referred to by the historian Julius Capitolinus, Ceionius Postumus claimed to be a descendant of the ancient patrician house of the Postumii, whose nomen was itself derived from the praenomen Postumus. Ceionius named his son Albinus, supposedly in reference both to the extraordinary whiteness of his skin, and to the noble family of the Postumii Albini; however, several other members of the gens also bore the surname Albinus.

== Members ==
This list includes abbreviated praenomina. For an explanation of this practice, see filiation.

=== Ceionii Commodi ===
- Lucius Ceionius Commodus, consul in AD 78.
- Lucius Ceionius (L. f.) Commodus, consul in AD 106.
- Lucius Ceionius L. f. (L. n.) Commodus Verus, consul in AD 136, adopted by the emperor Hadrian as his heir.
- (Marcus?) Ceionius (Commodus?), father of the consul of AD 156.
- Marcus Ceionius Silvanus, consul in AD 156.
- Lucius Ceionius L. f. L. n. Commodus, better known as Lucius Verus, emperor with his adoptive brother Marcus Aurelius from AD 161 to 169.
- Ceionia L. f. L. n. Fabia, one of the sisters of Lucius Verus, was originally betrothed to Marcus Aurelius; the engagement was dissolved at the request of Antoninus Pius, and she married Plautius Quintillus, consul in AD 159.
- Ceionia L. f. L. n. Plautia, a sister of Lucius Verus, married Quintus Servilius Pudens, consul in AD 166.
- Gaius Avidius Ceionius L. f. L. n. Commodus, the brother of Lucius Verus.

=== Ceionii Albini ===
- Ceionius Postumus, said by the Historia Augusta to be the father of the emperor Albinus. Syme said he is an invention of the author.
- Decimus Clodius Albinus, emperor from AD 196 to 197.
- Ceionius Postumianus, a relative of the emperor Albinus, who helped him gain the attention of the Antonines. Syme said he is an invention of the Historia Augusta.
- Ceionius Albinus, a distinguished man, probably a relative of the emperor Albinus, put to death by Septimius Severus. Syme said he is an invention of the Historia Augusta.
- Ceionius Albinus, praefectus urbi under the emperor Valerian; his full name may have been Marcus Nummius Ceionius Annius Albinus. A Nummius Albinus was praefectus urbi in AD 256.
- Gaius Ceionius Rufius Volusianus, praefectus urbi of Rome in AD 310 and 311, and from 313 to 315, as well as consul in 311 and 314.
- Ceionius C. f. Rufius Albinus, consul in AD 335, and praefectus urbi from 335 to 337.
- Gaius Ceionius Rufius Volusianus signo Lampadius, praetorian prefect of Gaul in AD 354 and 355, proconsul of Africa, and praefectus urbi in 365.
- Ceionius C. f. Rufius Albinus, praefectus urbi from AD 389 to 391.
- Ceionius C. f. Rufius Volusianus, vicar of Asia before 390.
- Publius Ceionius C. f. Caecina Albinus, grandfather of Eustochius, Bishop of Tours during the mid-5th century.

=== Ceionii Juliani ===
- Ceionius Julianus, praefectus urbi in AD 310 and 311, a friend of the historian Vopiscus. Possibly fictitious or a confusion with the other Juliani.
- Marcus Ceionius Julianus Camenius, proconsul of Africa from 326 to 333 and praefectus urbi of Rome in 333–334.
- Publius Publilius Ceionius M. f. Julianus, corrector of Tuscany and Umbria before 370.
- Alfenius Ceionius P. f. M. n. Julianus Camenius, a pagan, held several priesthoods and was vicar of Africa in 381.
- Caeionius Camenius, possibly a son of Alfenius.
- Caeionia Fusciana, sister of Caeionius Camenius.

=== Others ===
- Ceionius, praefectus castrorum under Publius Quinctilius Varus, took his own life after the disaster of Teutoburg Forest, in AD 9.
- Marcia Aurelia Ceionia Demetrias, a freedwoman of the emperor Lucius Verus, and mistress of the emperor Commodus, in whose downfall she played a prominent part; she was later put to death by Didius Julianus.
- Ceionius Virius Bassus, consul in AD 271, and a friend of the emperor Aurelian, to whom he wrote a letter respecting the destruction of Palmyra.
- Ceionius Varus, praefectus urbi in AD 284 and 285.

== See also ==
- List of Roman gentes

== Bibliography ==
- Marcus Velleius Paterculus, Compendium of Roman History.
- Lucius Cassius Dio Cocceianus (Cassius Dio), Roman History.
- Herodianus, History of the Empire from the Death of Marcus.
- Acts of the Arval Brethren.
- Aelius Lampridius, Aelius Spartianus, Flavius Vopiscus, Julius Capitolinus, Trebellius Pollio, and Vulcatius Gallicanus, Historia Augusta (Augustan History).
- Dictionary of Greek and Roman Biography and Mythology, William Smith, ed., Little, Brown and Company, Boston (1849).
- Theodor Mommsen et alii, Corpus Inscriptionum Latinarum (The Body of Latin Inscriptions, abbreviated CIL), Berlin-Brandenburgische Akademie der Wissenschaften (1853–present).
- René Cagnat et alii, L'Année épigraphique (The Year in Epigraphy, abbreviated AE), Presses Universitaires de France (1888–present).
- George Davis Chase, "The Origin of Roman Praenomina", in Harvard Studies in Classical Philology, vol. VIII (1897).
- Ronald Syme, "Antonine Relatives: Ceionii and Vettuleni", in Athenaeum, vol. xxxv (1957).
- D.P. Simpson, Cassell's Latin and English Dictionary, Macmillan Publishing Company, New York (1963).
- Anthony R. Birley, Marcus Aurelius, B. T. Batsford, London (1966).
- E. Mary Smallwood, Documents Illustrating the Principates of Nerva, Trajan, and Hadrian, Cambridge University Press (1966).
- Syme, Ronald, Ammianus and the Historia Augusta, Oxford University Press (1968).
- A. H. M. Jones & J. R. Martindale, The Prosopography of the Later Roman Empire (abbreviated PLRE), Cambridge University Press (1971–1992).
- Paul A. Gallivan, "The Fasti for A.D. 70–96", in Classical Quarterly, vol. 31, pp. 186–220 (1981).
- T. S. M. Mommaerts & D. H. Kelley, "The Anicii of Gaul and Rome", in Fifth-century Gaul: a Crisis of Identity?, John Drinkwater and Hugh Elton, eds., Cambridge University Press, (1992).
- Werner Eck, "Die Fasti consulares der Regierungszeit des Antoninus Pius, eine Bestandsaufnahme seit Géza Alföldys Konsulat und Senatorenstand", in Studia Epigraphica in Memoriam Géza Alföldy, Werner Eck, Benedictus Fehér, and Péter Kovács, eds., Bonn (2013).
- August Pauly; Georg Wissowa; Wilhelm Kroll; Kurt Witte; Karl Mittelhaus; Konrat Ziegler, eds. (1894–1980). Paulys Realencyclopädie der classischen Altertumswissenschaft. Stuttgart: J. B. Metzler.
