= Lucius Aelius Caesar =

Adopted son and heir of Emperor Hadrian (101–138)

Lucius Aelius
- Caesar of the Roman Empire
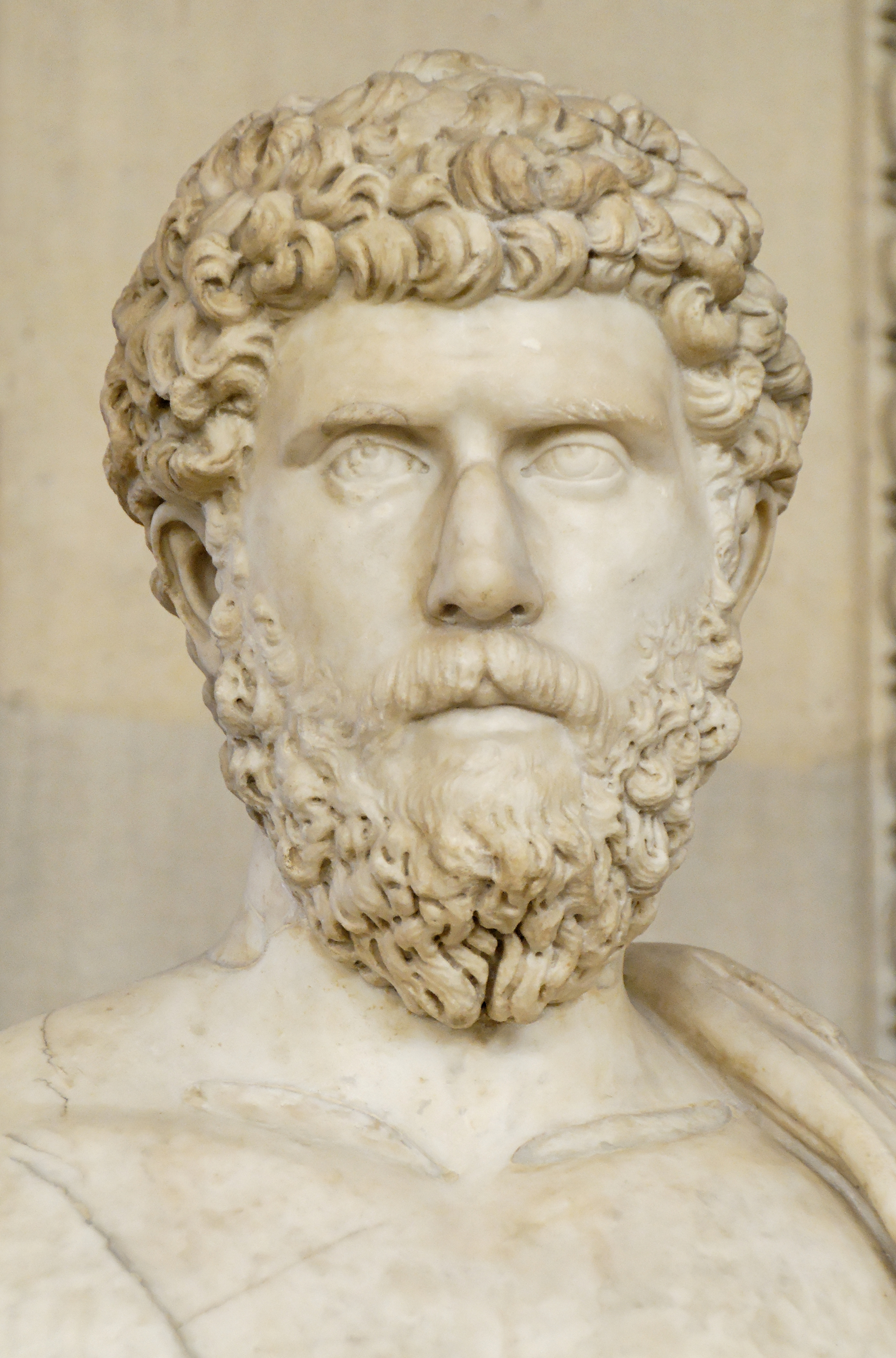
- Lucius Aelius, Louvre, Paris
- Born: 13 January 101
- Died: 1 January 138 (aged 36)
- Spouse: Avidia
- Issue: Lucius Verus; Ceionia Fabia; Ceionia Plautia
Names
- Lucius Ceionius Commodus (from birth until adoption by Hadrian)
Regnal name
- Lucius Aelius Caesar (as Imperial heir)
- Father: Lucius Ceionius Commodus; Hadrian (adoptive)
- Mother: Plautia

Lucius Aelius Caesar (13 January 101 – 1 January 138) was heir to the throne of the Roman Empire and the father of Emperor Lucius Verus. In 136, he was adopted by the reigning emperor Hadrian and named heir to the throne. He died before Hadrian and thus never became emperor. After Lucius' death, he was replaced by Antoninus Pius, who succeeded Hadrian the same year.

== Life and family ==
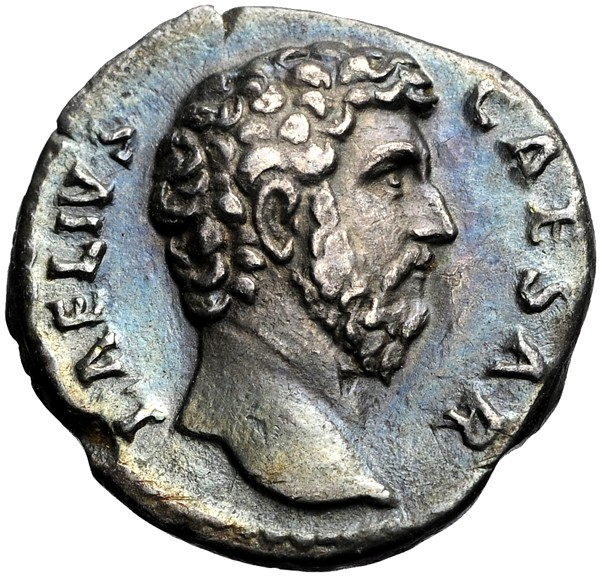
Denarius of Aelius

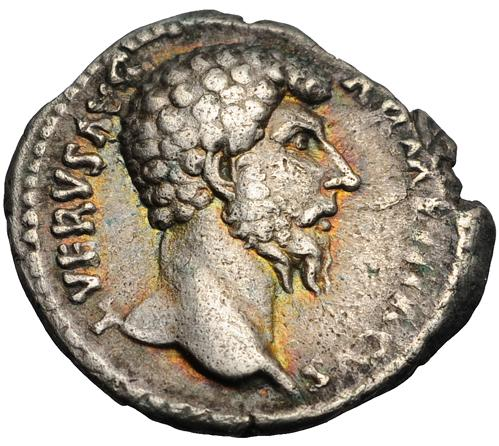
Denarius of Aelius' son, future Roman emperor Lucius Verus

Aelius was born Lucius Ceionius Commodus, and became Lucius Aelius Caesar upon his adoption as Hadrian's heir. He is sometimes referred to as Lucius Aelius Verus, though this name is not attested outside the Historia Augusta, where it probably was originally the result of a manuscript error. The young Lucius Ceionius Commodus was of the gens Ceionia. His father, also named Lucius Ceionius Commodus (the Historia Augusta adds the cognomen Verus), was consul in 106 and his paternal grandfather, also of the same name, was consul in 78. His paternal ancestors were from Etruria, and were of consular rank. His mother is surmised to have been an undocumented Roman woman named Plautia. The Historia Augusta states that his maternal grandfather and his maternal ancestors were of consular rank.

Before 130, the younger Lucius Commodus married Avidia, a well-connected Roman noblewoman who was the daughter of the senator Gaius Avidius Nigrinus. Avidia bore Lucius at least one son and two daughters, who were:

- Lucius Ceionius Commodus – The future Lucius Verus, co-emperor with Marcus Aurelius from 161 until his own death in 169. Verus would marry Lucilla, the second daughter of Marcus Aurelius and Faustina the Younger.
- Ceionia Fabia – at the time of Marcus Aurelius's adoption, she was betrothed, as part of the adoption conditions, to him. Shortly after Antoninus Pius' ascension, Pius came to Aurelius and asked him to end his engagement to Fabia, instead marrying Antoninus Pius’ daughter Faustina the Younger; Faustina had originally been planned by Hadrian to wed Lucius Verus.
- Ceionia Plautia

== Heir to Hadrian ==
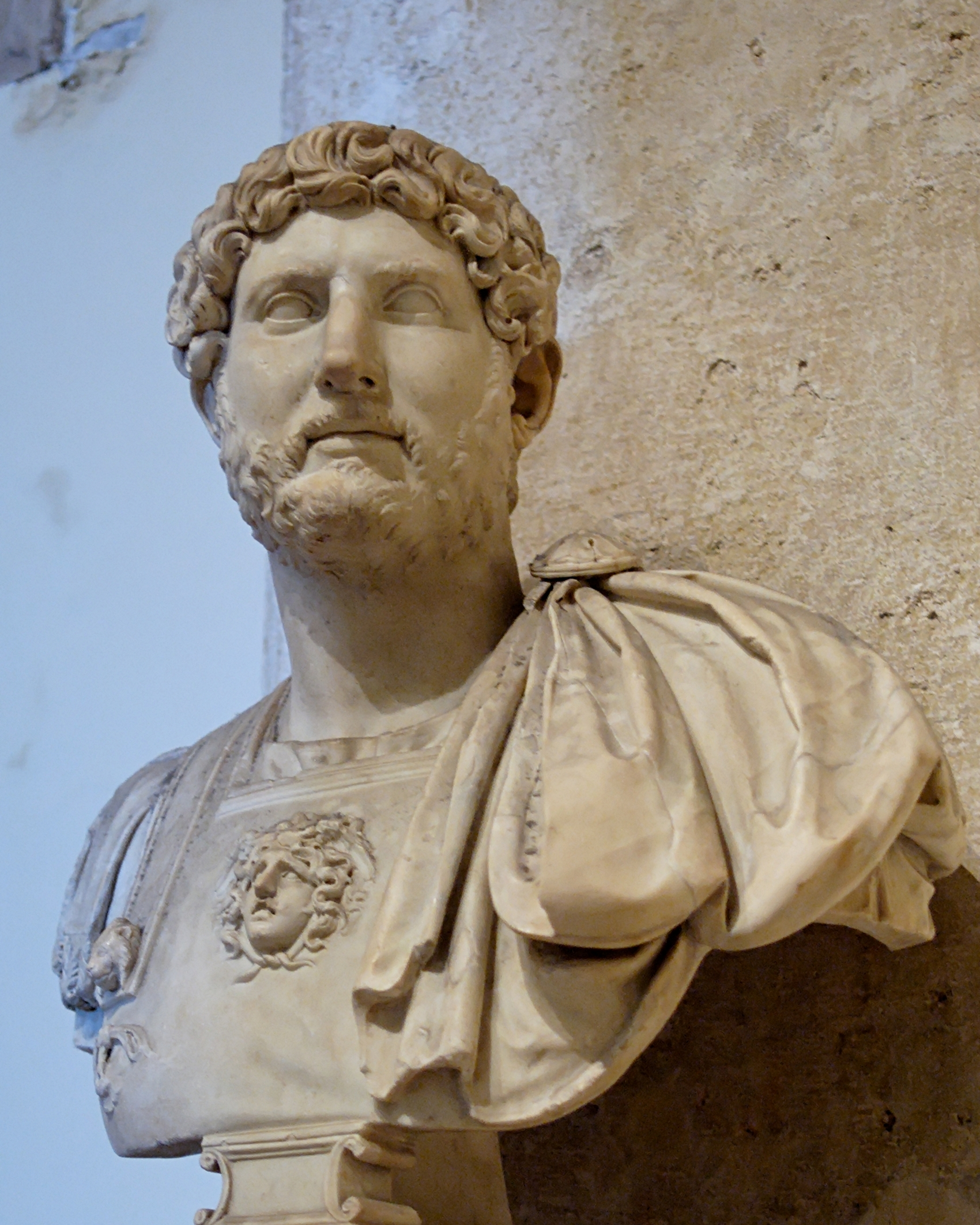
Bust of Hadrian, Capitoline Museums

For a long time, the emperor Hadrian had considered his brother-in-law Lucius Julius Ursus Servianus as his unofficial successor. As Hadrian's reign drew to a close, however, he changed his mind. Although the emperor certainly thought Servianus capable of ruling as an emperor after Hadrian's own death, Servianus, by now in his nineties, was clearly too old for the position. Hadrian's attentions turned to Servianus' grandson, Lucius Pedanius Fuscus Salinator. Hadrian promoted the young Salinator, his great-nephew, gave him special status in his court, and groomed him as his heir.

However, in the summer of 136, Hadrian almost died from a haemorrhage. Convalescent in his villa at Tivoli, he decided to change his mind, and selected Lucius Ceionius Commodus as his new successor, adopting him as his son. The selection was done invitis omnibus, "against the wishes of everyone"; in particular, Servianus and the young Salinator became very angry at Hadrian and wished to challenge him over the adoption. Even today, the rationale for Hadrian's sudden switch is still unclear. It is possible Salinator went so far as to attempt a coup against Hadrian in which Servianus was implicated. In order to avoid any potential conflict in the succession, Hadrian ordered the deaths of Salinator and Servianus.

== Death ==
After a year's stationing on the Danube frontier, Aelius returned to Rome to make an address to the senate on the first day of 138. The night before the speech, however, he grew ill, and died of a haemorrhage late the next day. (Note: Commodus was a known consumptive at the time of his adoption, so Hadrian may have intended the eventual post-Antoninus succession, anyway.) On 24 January 138, Hadrian selected Titus Aurelius Antoninus as his new successor.

After a few days' consideration, Antoninus accepted. He was adopted on 25 February 138. As part of Hadrian's terms, Antoninus adopted both Lucius Aelius's son, Lucius Ceionius Commodus, and Hadrian's great-nephew by marriage, Marcus Annius Verus. Marcus became "Marcus Aelius Aurelius Verus" (later Marcus Aurelius Antoninus); and Lucius became "Lucius Aelius Aurelius Commodus" (later Lucius Aurelius Verus). (Note: The younger Lucius Commodus did not take the cognomen Verus until his joint accession with Marcus after the death of Pius.) At Hadrian's request, Antoninus' daughter Faustina was betrothed to Lucius.

Marcus Aurelius later co-ruled with Lucius Verus as joint Roman Emperors, until Lucius Verus died in 169, after which Aurelius was sole ruler until his own death in 180.

In his History of the Decline and Fall of the Roman Empire, Edward Gibbon tells of Aelius's brief time as Hadrian's successor-designate in these terms:

After revolving in his mind several men of distinguished merit, whom he esteemed and hated, [Hadrian] adopted Ælius Verus a gay and voluptuous nobleman, recommended by uncommon beauty to the lover of Antinous. But whilst Hadrian was delighting himself with his own applause, and the acclamations of the soldiers, whose consent had been secured by an immense donative, the new Cæsar was ravished from his embraces by an untimely death.

== Sources ==
The major sources for the life of Aelius are patchy and frequently unreliable. The most important group of sources, the biographies contained in the Historia Augusta, claim to be written by a group of authors at the turn of the 4th century, but are in fact written by a single author (referred to here as "the biographer") from the later 4th century (c. 395).

The later biographies and the biographies of subordinate emperors and usurpers are a tissue of lies and fiction, but the earlier biographies, derived primarily from now-lost earlier sources (Marius Maximus or Ignotus), are much more accurate. For Aelius, the biographies of Hadrian, Antoninus Pius, Marcus and Lucius Verus are largely reliable, but that of Avidius Cassius, and even Lucius Aelius' own, is full of fiction.

Some other literary sources provide specific detail: the writings of the physician Galen on the habits of the Antonine elite, the orations of Aelius Aristides on the temper of the times, and the constitutions preserved in the Digest and Codex Justinianus on Marcus' legal work. Inscriptions and coin finds supplement the literary sources.

== Nerva–Antonine family tree ==
Nerva–Antonine family tree

Q. Marcius Barea Soranus	Q. Marcius Barea Sura	Antonia Furnilla	M. Cocceius Nerva	Sergia Plautilla	P. Aelius Hadrianus
Titus (r. 79–81)	Marcia Furnilla	Marcia	Trajanus Pater	Nerva (r. 96–98)	Ulpia (Note: Sister of Trajan's father: Giacosa (1977), p. 7.)	Aelius Hadrianus Marullinus
Flavia (Note: Giacosa (1977), p. 8.)	Marciana (Note: Levick (2014), p. 161.)	C. Salonius Matidius (Note: Husband of Ulpia Marciana: Levick (2014), p. 161.)	Trajan (r. 98–117)	Plotina	P. Acilius Attianus	P. Aelius Afer (Note: Giacosa (1977), p. 7.)	Paulina Major (Note: DIR contributor (Herbert W. Benario, 2000), "Hadrian".)
Lucius Mindius (2)	Libo Rupilius Frugi (3)	Salonia Matidia (Note: Giacosa (1977), p. 9.)	L. Vibius Sabinus (1) (Note: Husband of Salonia Matidia: Levick (2014), p. 161.)
Paulina Minor	L. Julius Ursus Servianus (Note: Smith (1870), "Julius Servianus".)
Matidia Minor	Sabina	Hadrian (Note: Smith (1870), "Hadrian", pp. 319–322.) (r. 117–138)	Antinous (Note: Lover of Hadrian: Lambert (1984), p. 99 and passim; deification: Lambert (1984), pp. 2–5, etc.)
C. Fuscus Salinator I	Julia Serviana Paulina
M. Annius Verus (Note: Husband of Rupilia Faustina: Levick (2014), p. 163.)	Rupilia Faustina (Note: Levick (2014), p. 163.) (Note: It is uncertain whether Rupilia Faustina was Frugi's daughter by Salonia Matidia or another woman.)	Boionia Procilla	Cn. Arrius Antoninus
L. Ceionius Commodus	Appia Severa	C. Fuscus Salinator II
L. Caesennius Paetus	Arria Antonina	Arria Fadilla (Note: Levick (2014), p. 162.)	T. Aurelius Fulvus
L. Caesennius Antoninus	L. Commodus	Plautia	unknown (Note: Levick (2014), p. 164.)	C. Avidius Nigrinus
M. Annius Verus	Calvisia Domitia Lucilla (Note: Wife of M. Annius Verus: Giacosa (1977), p. 10.)	Fundania (Note: Wife of M. Annius Libo: Levick (2014), p. 163.)	M. Annius Libo	Faustina	Antoninus Pius (r. 138–161)	L. Aelius Caesar	Avidia
Cornificia	Marcus Aurelius (r. 161–180) (Note: Giacosa (1977), p. 10.)	Faustina Minor	Aurelia Fadilla	Lucius Verus (r. 161–169) (1)	Ceionia Fabia	Plautius Quintillus (Note: Husband of Ceionia Fabia: Levick (2014), p. 164.)	Q. Servilius Pudens	Ceionia Plautia
Cornificia Minor (Note: Levick (2014), p. 117.)	M. Petronius Sura	Commodus (r. 177–192)	Fadilla	M. Annius Verus Caesar	Ti. Claudius Pompeianus (2)	Lucilla	M. Plautius Quintillus	Junius Licinius Balbus	Servilia Ceionia
Petronius Antoninus	L. Aurelius Agaclytus (2)	Aurelia Sabina	L. Antistius Burrus (1)	Plautius Quintillus	Plautia Servilla	C. Furius Sabinus Timesitheus	Maecia Faustina	Junius Licinius Balbus?
Furia Sabinia Tranquillina	Gordian III (r. 238–244)

- (1) = 1st spouse
- (2) = 2nd spouse
- (3) = 3rd spouse
- Reddish-purple indicates emperor of the Nerva–Antonine dynasty
  lighter purple indicates designated imperial heir of said dynasty who never reigned
  grey indicates unsuccessful imperial aspirants
  bluish-purple indicates emperors of other dynasties
- dashed lines indicate adoption; dotted lines indicate love affairs/unmarried relationships
- Small Caps = posthumously deified (Augusti, Augustae, or other)

Notes:

Except where otherwise noted, the notes below indicate that an individual's parentage is as shown in the above family tree.

References:
- DIR contributors (2000). "De Imperatoribus Romanis: An Online Encyclopedia of Roman Rulers and Their Families".
- Giacosa, Giorgio (1977). Women of the Caesars: Their Lives and Portraits on Coins. Translated by Holloway, R. Ross. Milan: Edizioni Arte e Moneta. ISBN 0-8390-0193-2.
- Lambert, Royston (1984). Beloved and God: The Story of Hadrian and Antinous. New York: Viking. ISBN 0-670-15708-2.
- Levick, Barbara (2014). Faustina I and II: Imperial Women of the Golden Age. Oxford University Press. ISBN 978-0-19-537941-9.
- Smith, William, ed. (1870). Dictionary of Greek and Roman Biography and Mythology.

== Notes ==
All citations to the Historia Augusta are to individual biographies, and are marked with a "HA". Citations to the works of Fronto are cross-referenced to C.R. Haines' Loeb edition.

== Bibliography ==
- Birley, Anthony R. (2013). Hadrian: The Restless Emperor. Abingdon: Routledge. pp. 291–292. ISBN 978-0-415-16544-0.
- Birley, Anthony R. (2000a). Marcus Aurelius: A biography. Routledge. ISBN 9780415171250.
- Birley, Anthony R. (2000). "Hadrian to the Antonines". In Bowman, Alan K.; Garnsey, Peter; Rathbone, Dominic (eds.). The Cambridge Ancient History, Volume XI: The High Empire, A.D. 70–192. Cambridge: Cambridge University Press. pp. 132–94. ISBN 978-0-5212-6335-1.

Political offices
Preceded by Trajan	Roman caesar 136–137	Succeeded by Antoninus Pius
Preceded by P. Rutilius Fabianus, Gn. Papirius Aelianus as suffect consuls	Roman consul 136 with Sex. Vettulenus Civica Pompeianus	Succeeded by himself, P. Coelius Balbinus Vibullius Pius as ordinary consuls
Preceded by Lucius Ceionius Commodus, Sex. Vettulenus Civica Pompeianus as ordinary consuls	Roman consul 137 with P. Coelius Balbinus Vibullius Pius	Succeeded by Kanus Junius Niger and G. Pomponius Camerinus as ordinary consuls
