= Septicia gens =

Ancient Roman family with the nomen Septicius

The gens Septicia was an obscure plebeian family at ancient Rome. Hardly any members of this gens are mentioned in ancient writers, but a number are known from inscriptions. The most famous of the Septicii was Gaius Septicius Clarus, Prefect of the Praetorian Guard under the emperor Hadrian.

== Origin ==
The nomen Septicius belongs to a class of gentilicia originally formed from cognomina ending in -ex or -icis. As with other gentile-forming suffixes, -icius was later extended to form nomina from other names, including existing gentilicia. The root of the name must have resembled the rare Latin praenomen Septimus, "seventh", in which case Septicius may be cognate with the more typical patronymic Septimius.

== Praenomina ==
The main praenomina of the Septicii were Aulus, Gaius, and Marcus, followed by Publius, Quintus, and Titus, all of which were common throughout all periods of Roman history. Other names occur infrequently. From a filiation, it seems that at least one of the Septicii bore the Oscan praenomen Salvius. In Etruria, where women's praenomina were common, one of the women of the Salvii bore the feminine praenomen Rufa, which another of the gens bore as a cognomen.

== Members ==
This list includes abbreviated praenomina. For an explanation of this practice, see filiation.

- Septicia M. l. Sotica, a freedwoman buried at Altinum in Venetia and Histria during the latter half of the first century BC, along with Septicia Tuetien.
- Septicia L. l. Tuetien (?), a freedwoman buried at Altinum during the latter half of the first century BC, along with Septicia Sotica.
- Septicius, a friend of Horace, who mentions him among the guests he planned to invite to dinner in a letter to Aulus Manlius Torquatus.
- Quintus Septicius C. Q. l. Verna, a freedman named in an inscription from Lanuvium in Latium, dating to the late first century BC, or early first century AD.
- Gaius Septicius C. l. Myro, a freedman named in an inscription from Rome, dating to the late first century BC, or early first century AD.
- Aulus Septicius Sal. l. Alexander, a freedman and coronarius, or wreath-maker, on the Sacra Via in Rome, named in a sepulchral inscription dating to the last quarter of the first century BC, or the first quarter of the first century AD, along with Septicia Chreste and Aulus Septicius Hermia.
- Septicia A. l. Chreste, a freedwoman named in a funerary inscription from Rome, dating between 25 BC and AD 25, along with Aulus Septicius Alexander and Aulus Septicius Hermia.
- Aulus Septicius A. l. Hermia, a freedman named in a sepulchral inscription from Rome, dating between 25 BC and AD 25, along with Aulus Septicius Alexander and Septicia Chreste.
- Septicia Ɔ. l. Paladio, a freedwoman buried at Rome in the early part of the first century; Septicius Salvius, freed along with her, donated a pot in her memory.
- Septicius Salvius, a freedman, donated a pot in memory of Septicia Paladio, a woman who had been freed along with him, during the early part of the first century.
- Aulus Septicius A. Ɔ. l. Salvius, a freedman, and auri acceptor, or dealer in gold, on the Sacra Via during the early part of the first century.
- Septicia, a widow from Ariminum, whose second marriage caused some consternation amongst her sons.
- Marcus Septicius Q. f. C. n. Sura, mentioned in an inscription from Rome dating to the reign of Caligula.
- Septicia Anthis, named in an inscription from Rome, dating to the first half of the first century, along with Publius Septicius Dionysius and Publius Septicius Nua.
- Gnaeus Septicius Cn. l. Laus, a freedman buried at Rome, aged ninety, along with his wife, Septicia Celido, in a tomb dating to the first half of the first century, dedicated by their client, Septicia Meritoria.
- Septicia Celido, the wife of Gnaeus Septicius Laus, with whom she was buried at Rome in the first half of the first century, in a tomb dedicated by their client, Septicia meritoria.
- Marcus Septicius M. l. Antiochus, a freedman buried at Rome in the first half of the first century, along with his wife, Allia Hilara.
- Aulus Septicius A. l. Apollonius, a freedman and brattiarius, or gold-leaf beater, named in a sepulchral inscription from Rome, dating to the first half of the first century, along with Septicia Rufa.
- Marcus Septicius M. f. Bassus, buried at Rome, aged twenty-six, during the first half of the first century.
- Publius Septicius Dionysius, named in an inscription from Rome, dating to the first half of the first century, along with Publius Septicius Nua and Septicia Anthis.
- Septicia A. l. Rufa, a freedwoman and brattiaria named in a sepulchral inscription from Rome, dating to the first half of the first century, along with Aulus Septicius Apollonius.
- Septicia Meritoria, dedicated a tomb at Rome for her brother, Gaius Julius Comes, aged twenty-five, and another for her patrons, Gnaeus Septicius Laus and Septicia Celido, all dating to the first half of the first century.
- Publius Septicius Nua, named in an inscription from Rome, dating to the first half of the first century, along with Publius Septicius Dionysius and Septicia Anthis.
- Gaius Septicius C. l. Albanus, a freedman at Rome during the early or middle of the first century, who built a tomb for himself, his brother, Gaius Septicius Tarula, and his wife, Septicia Primigenia.
- Gaius Septicius C. l. Tarula, a freedman buried at Rome in the early or middle of the first century, in a tomb built by his brother, Gaius Septicius Albanus.
- Septicia C. l. Primigenia, a freedwoman buried at Rome in the early or middle of the first century, in a tomb built by her husband, Gaius Septicius Albanus.
- Septicia Arecusa, buried at Rome during the first century.
- Aulus Septicius A. l. Daphinus, a freedman buried at Rome during the first century, aged fifty-five, along with Septicia Secunda and Aulus Septicius Soterichus, in a tomb built by Decimus Publicius Linus.
- Septicia A. l. Secunda, a freedwoman buried at Rome during the first century, along with Aulus Septicius Daphinus and Aulus Septicius Soterichus, in a tomb built by Decimus Publicius Linus.
- Aulus Septicius A. l. Soterichus, a freedman buried at Rome during the first century, along with Aulus Septicius Daphinus and Septicia Secunda, in a tomb built by Decimus Publicius Linus.
- Marcus Septicius C. f., standard-bearer for an unspecified legion, built a first-century sepulchre at Corduba in Hispania Baetica for himself, his wife, Sabina, and son, Marcus Septicius Martialis.
- Marcus Septicius M. l. Martialis, son and freedman of Marcus Septicius, the standard-bearer, was buried in the family sepulchre built by his father at Corduba, aged ten years and seven months.
- Gaius Septicius Italicus, a child buried at Rome in the second half of the first century, aged one year, nine months, and five days, with a monument dedicated by his parents.
- Septicia Fortunata, dedicated a tomb at Rome to her patron, Quintus Septicius Soter, dating from the first or second century.
- Quintus Septicius Epagathus, buried at Rome in the late first or early second century, in a tomb dedicated by his children.
- Quintus Septicius Soter, buried at Rome in the first or second century, with a tomb dedicated by his client, Septicia Fortunata.
- Marcus Septicius Crescens of Beneventum, listed in an accounting from AD 101.
- Septicius Rufus of Beneventum, listed in an accounting from AD 101.
- Gaius Septicius Clarus, appointed praetorian prefect by Hadrian, but removed from office soon afterward, as Hadrian had become suspicious of most of those close to him. Septicius was a friend of both Pliny the Younger and Suetonius, who dedicated The Twelve Caesars to him.
- Gaius Septicius Cissus, a little boy buried at Ostia in Latium, during or soon after the reign of Hadrian, with a monument from Diapyrus, the slave of Septicius Clarus. The inscription suggests that Diapyrus, and not Clarus, was the boy's father, although this may have been metaphorical.
- Marcus Septicius Onesimus, one of the Seviri at Comum in Cisalpine Gaul at some point between the mid-first and early third century, buried in a family sepulchre built by Gaius Catius Bromius.
- Septicia Sura, probably the wife of Lucius Petronius Melior, was buried at Aquae Statiellae in Liguria during the first half of the second century.
- Gaius Septicius Dor[...], a priest at Rome in AD 129.
- Gaius Septicius Crispinus, a soldier in the century of Iedarnus, in the seventh cohort of the Praetorian Guard, in AD 143.
- Septicius Adjutor, buried in a family sepulchre built by Lucius Antistius Zosimus at Augusta Taurinorum in Cisalpine Gaul during the second century. The inscription seems to identify Septicius as the father of Antistius.
- Septicia M. f. Marcellina, named in an inscription from Vercellae in Cisalpine Gaul, dating to the second century.
- Septicia Priscilla, buried at Rome in the second century, with a monument from her husband.
- Marcus Septicius M. f., a soldier in the century of Dexter, in the seventh cohort of the Praetorian Guard, in AD 155.
- Publius Septicius Varus, a soldier named in an inscription from Eporedia in Cisalpine Gaul, dating to the latter half of the second century.
- Septicia Valeriana, together with Optatia Siora, made a dedicatory offering at Lugdunum in Gallia Lugdunensis in AD 197.
- Septicius Charis, a soldier serving in the century of Quintinus, in the first cohort of the vigiles at Rome in AD 205.
- Septicia Maura, buried at Mediolanum in Cisalpine Gaul during the third or fourth century, aged thirty-eight years, five months, and fourteen days, with a monument from her husband, Lucius Trebius Divus.

=== Undated Septicii ===
- Septicia, a freedwoman who along with her sister, Numisia, dedicated a tomb at Rome for their sister, Chloe Misella, aged eighteen.
- Septicia, a woman buried at Marinum in Latium.
- Septicia T. l., a freedwoman buried at Rome, in a sepulchre with Titus Septicius Liccaeus and other freedmen, including another freedwoman named Septicia.
- Septicia Ɔ. l., a freedwoman buried at Rome, in a sepulchre with Titus Septicius Liccaeus and other freedmen, including another freedwoman named Septicia.
- Aulus Septicius, named in an inscription from Rome.
- Gaius Septicius, a manufacturer of small pottery at Rome, along with Publius and Quintus Septicius.
- Manius Septicius, buried at Ardea in Latium, in a tomb dedicated by his children.
- Publius Septicius, a manufacturer of small pottery at Rome, along with Gaius and Quintus Septicius.
- Quintus Septicius, a manufacturer of small pottery at Rome, along with Gaius and Publius Septicius.
- Quintus Septicius, buried at Ephesus in Asia, aged forty years and five months, along with Mucia.
- Rufa Septicia, named in an inscription from Caere in Etruria.
- Titus Septicius Ɔ. l. Alexander, a freedman who built a sepulchre at Rome for himself, Salvilla, possibly his wife, and Septicia Secunda, both freedwomen.
- Septicia Antiochus, buried at Rome along with her husband, Aulus Septicius Apollonius.
- Aulus Septicius Apollonius, buried at Rome along with his wife, Septicia Antiochis.
- Marcus Septicius Cynthius, buried at Altinum.
- Publius Septicius P. l. Eutychus, a freedman named in an inscription from Ariminum.
- Septicius Faustus, named in a fragmentary inscription from Rome.
- Titus Septicius Faustus, named in an inscription from Rome.
- Marcus Septicius Felicissimus, buried at Beneventum in Samnium, with a monument from Ligeria Semne.
- Lucius Septicius Firmus, a veteran of the twelfth cohort, buried at Rome, aged forty-three, in a sepulchre dedicated by his wife, Cornelia Veneria, along with their son, Lucius Faonius Firmus, aged nine years, five months, and twenty-two days.
- Septicia Ɔ. T. l. Flora, a freedwoman, and the wife of Gaius Maclonius Teres, named in an inscription from Forum Novum in Sabinum.
- Septicia Gemina, buried at Lugdunum in a tomb dedicated by Lucius Modius Annianus, her husband of thirty years.
- Aulus Septicius Hermogenes, buried in a family sepulchre at Rome.
- Septicia P. f. La[...], the daughter of Publius Septicius Secundus and Septicia Severa, buried at Rome, aged eleven years, six months, in a tomb dedicated by her parents.
- Septicia A. l. Laudice, a freedwoman buried at Rome.
- Septicia P. f. Leda, buried at Rome, along with her mother, Septicia Severa, in a family sepulchre dedicated by her father, Publius Septicius Secundus.
- Titus Septicius T. l. Liccaeus, a freedman buried at Rome, in a sepulchre with other freedmen, including two freedwomen named Septicia.
- Septicia Cn. l. Musa, a freedwoman buried at Rome.
- Septicius Primigenius, dedicated a tomb at Beneventum to his daughter, Septicia Primilla.
- Septicia Primilla, buried at Beneventum, in a tomb dedicated by her father, Septicius Primigenius.
- Septicia Primitiva, buried at Ostia, aged twenty-one, with a monument dedicated by her husband, Quintus Gargilius Quietus.
- Titus Septicius Salvius, named in an inscription from Rome.
- Septicia Secunda, a freedwoman buried at Rome in a tomb built by Titus Septicius Alexander for himself, Septicia, and Salvilla, possibly his wife.
- Publius Septicius Secundus, together with his wife, Septicia Severa, dedicated a tomb at Rome for their daughter, Septicia La[...]. He later built a family sepulchre, where his wife and their daughter, Septicia Leda, are buried.
- Septicia Severa, along with her husband, Publius Septicius Secundus, dedicated a tomb at Rome for their daughter, Septicia La[...]. She is buried in a family sepulchre built by her husband, along with their daughter, Septicia Leda.

== See also ==
- List of Roman gentes

== Bibliography ==
- Quintus Horatius Flaccus (Horace), Epistulae.
- Valerius Maximus, Factorum ac Dictorum Memorabilium (Memorable Facts and Sayings).
- Gaius Plinius Caecilius Secundus (Pliny the Younger), Epistulae (Letters).
- Gaius Suetonius Tranquillus, De Vita Caesarum (Lives of the Caesars, or The Twelve Caesars).
- Aelius Lampridius, Aelius Spartianus, Flavius Vopiscus, Julius Capitolinus, Trebellius Pollio, and Vulcatius Gallicanus, Historia Augusta (Lives of the Emperors).
- Dictionary of Greek and Roman Biography and Mythology, William Smith, ed., Little, Brown and Company, Boston (1849).
- Theodor Mommsen et alii, Corpus Inscriptionum Latinarum (The Body of Latin Inscriptions, abbreviated CIL), Berlin-Brandenburgische Akademie der Wissenschaften (1853–present).
- Bullettino della Commissione Archeologica Comunale in Roma (Bulletin of the Municipal Archaeological Commission of Rome, abbreviated BCAR), (1872–present).
- Notizie degli Scavi di Antichità (News of Excavations from Antiquity, abbreviated NSA), Accademia dei Lincei (1876–present).
- René Cagnat et alii, L'Année épigraphique (The Year in Epigraphy, abbreviated AE), Presses Universitaires de France (1888–present).
- Inschriften Griechischer Städte aus Kleinasien (Inscriptions from the Greek Cities of Asia Minor, abbreviated IK), Bonn (1973–present).
- Paola Brandizzi Vittucci, La collezione Lanza nella tenuta della Falcognana, Archaeological Commission of Latium, Rome (1983).
- Steven L. Tuck, Latin Inscriptions in the Kelsey Museum: The Dennison and De Criscio Collections, University of Michigan Press, Ann Arbor (2005).
- Lorenzo Calvelli, "Da Altina a Venezia", in Altino antica. Dai Veneti a Venezia, pp. 184–197, Marsilio, Venice (2011).
