= Quintus Licinius Modestinus =

2nd century Roman senator and consul

Quintus Licinius Modestinus [? Sextus] Attius Labeo was a Roman senator, who held a number of imperial appointments during the middle of the second century AD. He was suffect consul in the year 146, following the death of Sextus Erucius Clarus in March, serving until the end of June; his colleague was Gnaeus Claudius Severus Arabianus. He is known entirely from inscriptions.

== Life ==
An inscription from Castrimoenium (modern Marino), currently in the Gallaria Lapidaria of the Vatican Museum, provides us details of his cursus honorum. Modestinus began his career as one of the decemviri stlitibus judicandis, one of the four boards that form the vigintiviri; membership in one of these four boards was a preliminary and required first step toward gaining entry into the Roman Senate. Mireille Corbier interprets the combination of this position and a lack of service as a military tribune as making him "predestined for an administrative career". His next posting was as quaestor to the proconsular governor of Africa, and upon completion of this traditional Republican magistracy Modestinus was enrolled in the Senate. Two more of the traditional Republican magistracies followed: plebeian tribune and praetor.

Once he completed his term as praetor, Modestinus was qualified to hold several important offices. First was curator of the Via Salaria, which Géza Alföldy estimates was from around the year 138 to around 141. This was followed by prefectus of the aerarium Saturni; although Alföldy dates his tenure from around the year 141 to 144, Corbier has argued in her monograph on the prefects of the Roman treasuries that his tenure extended from the year 138 to 140. While being prefect of this treasury in most cases led immediately to the consulate, Modestinus was instead governor of the public province of Achaea for the term 144/145. However, Corbier lists two other men who held a propraetorian governorship before acceding to the consulate.

Modestinus also held a number of Roman priesthoods. These included membership in the collegium of the fetiales, in the sodales Augustales, and in the Quindecimviri sacris faciundis, the Roman priesthood entrusted with the care of the Sibylline oracles.

After his consulate, Modestinus' life is a blank.

Political offices
Preceded by Sextus Erucius Clarus II, and Gnaeus Claudius Severus Arabianus as ordinary consuls	Suffect consul of the Roman Empire; 146 with Gnaeus Claudius Severus Arabianus	Succeeded by Publius Mummius Sisenna Rutilianus, and Titus Prifernius Paetus Rosianus Geminus as suffect consuls
