= Marcus Erucius Clarus =

2nd century Roman military commander and consul

- Occupations: Politician, Military Commander
- Era: Nerva–Antonine Dynasty
- Title: Suffect Consul
- Relatives: Gaius Septicius Clarus (Brother) Sextus Erucius Clarus (Son or Nephew)

Marcus Erucius Clarus (fl. 2nd century AD), was an ancient Roman nobleman. He held the post of suffect consul in AD 117, and was an influential friend and supporter of the famous Silver Age author Pliny the Younger.

Clarus was described by Pliny as a man of honor, integrity and learning, as well as skilled in pleading cases. He accompanied the Emperor Trajan on his campaign against Parthia, where he distinguished himself by defeating a Parthian army near Seleucia, killing its general Sanatruces. For this achievement he was appointed suffect consul with his fellow general, Tiberius Julius Alexander Julianus, in 117.

He was the brother of Gaius Septicius Clarus, prefect of the Praetorian Guard under Hadrian. Based on the similarities of their names, Clarus may be the father of Sextus Erucius Clarus, twice consul and urban prefect.
