= Gnaeus Claudius Severus =

Gnaeus (or Cneius, Cnaeus) Claudius Severus may refer to these following Romans:

- Gnaeus Claudius Severus Arabianus, consul in 146
- Gnaeus Claudius Severus (consul 167), son of Arabianus, consul in 167 and 173
- Gnaeus Claudius Severus (consul 235), consul in 235
