= Omen (ancient Rome) =

Roman belief in a personal sign of the future

In the religions of ancient Rome, an omen, plural omina, was a sign intimating the future, considered less important to the community than a prodigium but of great importance to the person who heard or saw it.

Omina could be good or bad. Unlike prodigies, bad omina were never expiated by public rites but could be reinterpreted, redirected or otherwise averted. Some time around 282 BC, a diplomatic insult formally "accepted as omen" was turned against Tarentum and helped justify its conquest. A thunderclap cost Marcellus his very brief consulship (215 BC): thereafter he traveled in an enclosed litter when on important business, to avoid seeing possible bad omens that might affect his plans. Bad omens could be more actively dealt with, by countersigns or spoken formulae. Before his campaign against Perseus of Macedon, the consul L Aemilius Paullus was said to have heard of the death of Perseus, his daughter's puppy. He interpreted this as a favourable omen and defeated King Perseus at the Battle of Pydna (168 BC).

Some evidently took omens very seriously, others did not, or failed to avert bad omens and were thought to have paid the ultimate price. In 217 BC, the consul Gaius Flaminius "disregarded his horse's collapse, the chickens, and yet other omens, before his disaster at Lake Trasimene". Licinius Crassus took ship for Syria despite the ominous call of a fig-seller – "Cauneas!" ("Caunean figs!"), which might be heard as "Cave ne eas!" ("Beware, don't go!") – and was killed on campaign. Cicero saw these events as merely coincidental; only the credulous could think them ominous. Though by his time, politicians, military magnates and their supporters actively circulated tales of excellent omens that attended their births and careers.

In Roman histories and biographies, particularly Suetonius's Lives of the Caesars, the lives, personal character and destinies of various emperors can be read in reported portents, omens and dreams; the emperor Caligula, for example, dreamt that he stood before the throne of Jupiter, king of the gods, and Jupiter kicked him down from heaven to earth; Caligula ignored the premonition and was assassinated the next day.

Roman–Jewish historian Flavius Josephus introduced Roman omens into a Jewish religious context in his 75 AD book The Jewish War. Josephus lists a series of portents that precede the failed Great Jewish Revolt against the Roman Empire: a sword-like star, a year-long comet, a bright light during Passover lasting for 30 minutes, a cow giving birth to a lamb at the temple, the temple gates opening on their own, and an army of chariots in the clouds. These have less in common with earlier Jewish prophecies than with Roman omens. There are parallels with Roman emperors Julius Caesar, Claudius, and Nero, where biographers recorded lingering comets and bright lights to signal milestones in their lives. Classical historians Tacitus, Livy, Pliny, Herodotus, and Cassius Dio wrote of impossible births as prodigies. Josephus' description of the sky chariots has less in common with Elijah's chariot of fire than with the numerous Roman descriptions of armies in the clouds, such as Livy's account of an aerial army during the Cimbrian War. In the Gospel of Matthew, omens signal the birth and death of Jesus in a way that would be clearly understood by the contemporary Roman audience.

== See also ==
- Augur
- Auspice
