= Epistulae (Pliny) =

Personal missives by Pliny the Younger

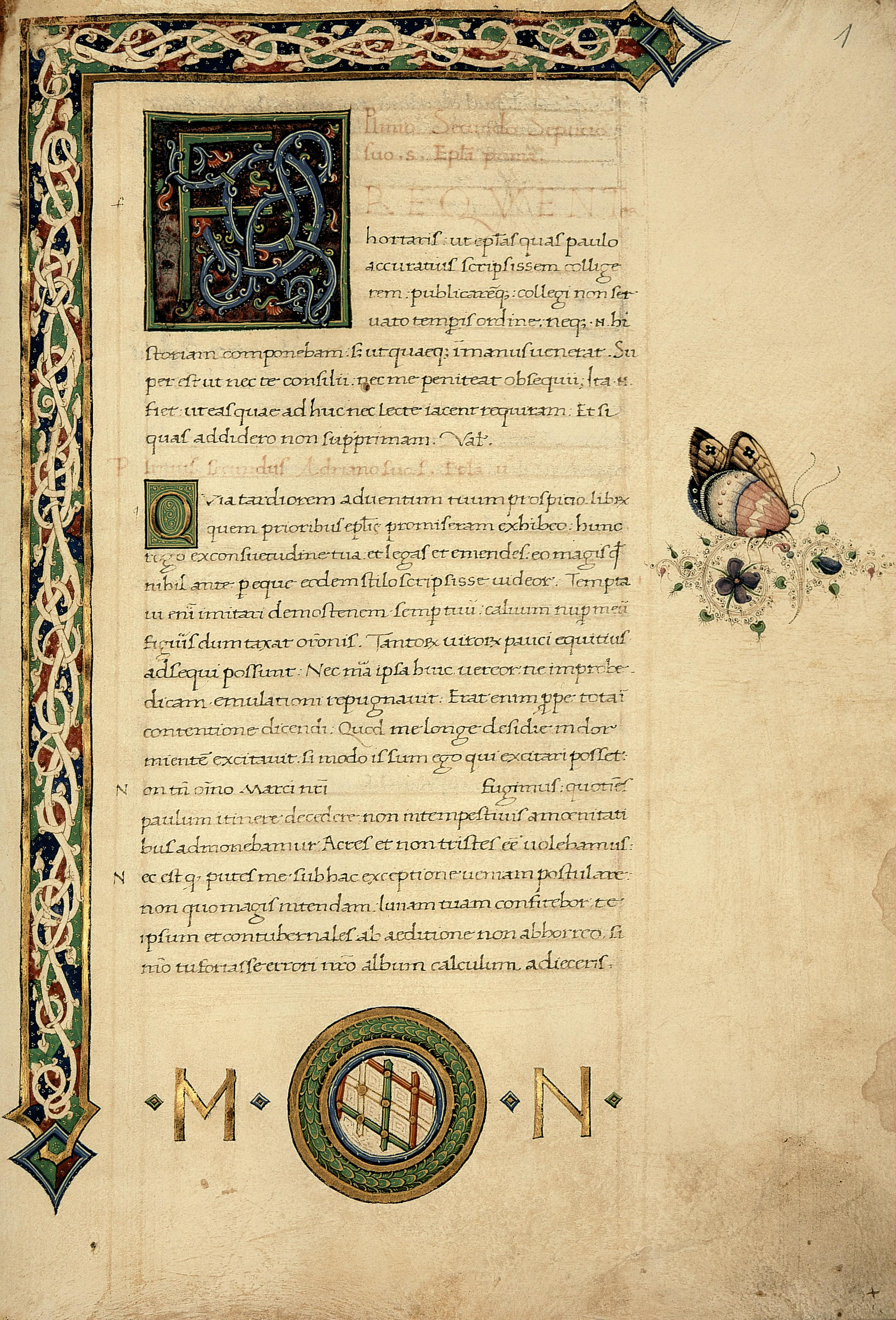
- Frontispiece of a 1711 edition of Pliny's Epistulae, published in Amsterdam.
- Author: Pliny the Younger
- Original title: Epistularum Libri Decem
- Language: Latin
- Genre: Epistolary, Letter collection
- Set in: 1st-century Roman Empire
- Publication date: c. 97–112 AD
- Publication place: Roman Empire
- Media type: Papyrus scroll (originally)
- Pages: 10 books (containing 369 letters)

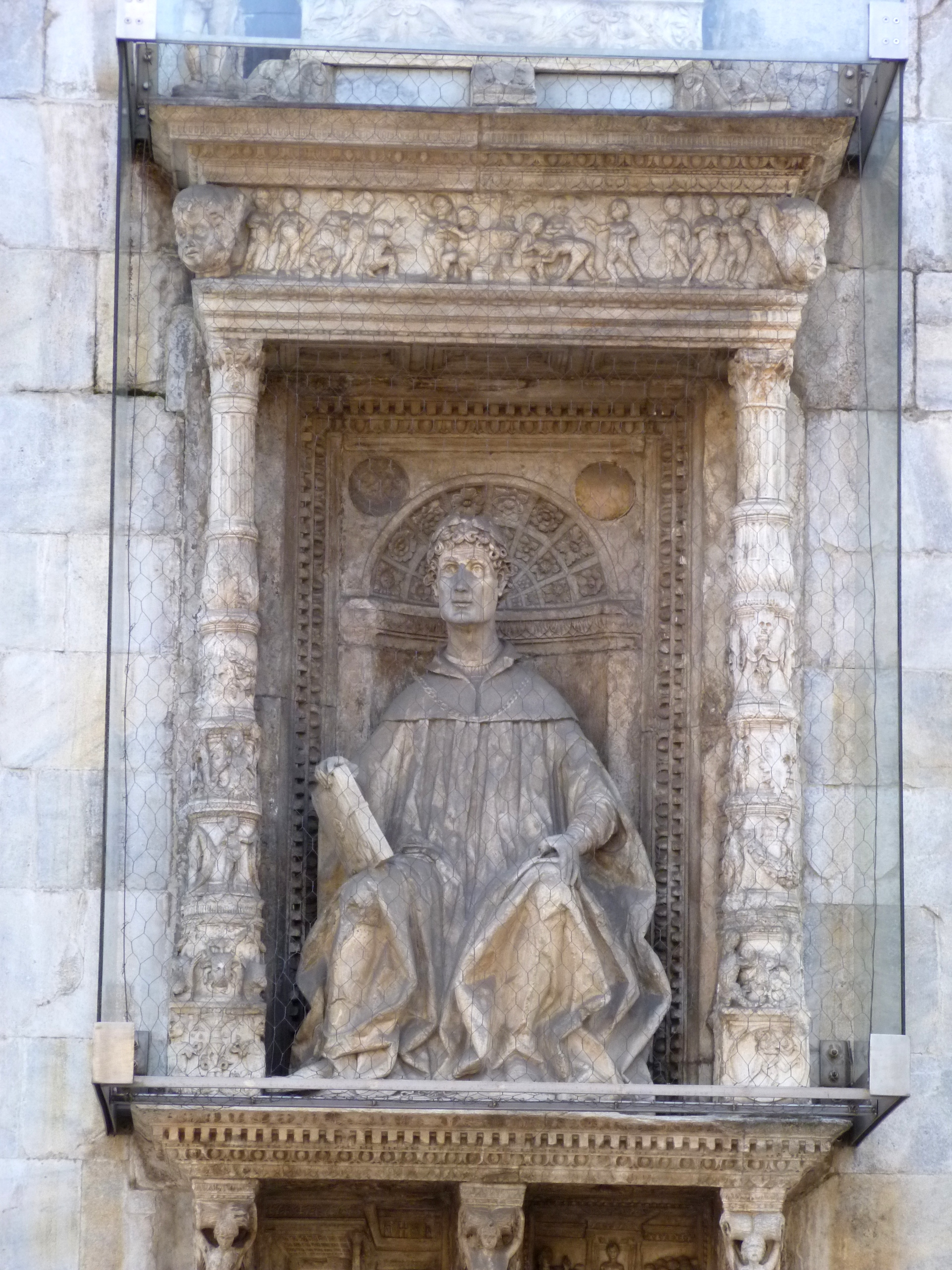
Statue of Pliny the Younger on the façade of Cathedral of S. Maria Maggiore in Como

The Epistulae ([ɛˈpɪs.t̪ʊ.ɫ̪ae̯], "letters") are a series of personal missives by Pliny the Younger directed to his friends and associates. These Latin letters are a unique testimony of Roman administrative history and everyday life in the 1st century. The style is very different from that in the Panegyricus, and some commentators maintain that Pliny initiated a new genre: the letter written for publication. The genre of the letter collection offers a different type of record than the more usual history; one that dispenses with objectivity but is no less valuable for it. Especially noteworthy among the letters are two in which he describes the eruption of Mount Vesuvius in 79 during which his uncle Pliny the Elder died (Epistulae VI.16, VI.20), and one in which he asks the Emperor for instructions regarding official policy concerning Christians (Epistulae X.96).

The Epistulae are usually treated as two halves: those in Books 1 to 9, which Pliny prepared for publication; and those in Book 10, which were written to or from the Emperor Trajan, and which were copied from the imperial archives. Pliny is not thought to have any influence in the selection of the letters in this book. The greater share of the letters in book 10 concern Pliny's governorship of Bithynia-Pontus.

Other major literary figures of the late 1st century AD appear in the collection as friends or acquaintances of Pliny's, e. g. the poet Martial, the historian Tacitus and the biographer Suetonius. However, arguably the most famous literary figure to appear in Pliny's letters is his uncle. His nephew provides details of how his uncle worked tirelessly to finish his magnum opus, the Historia Naturalis (Natural History). As heir to his uncle's estate, Pliny the Younger inherited the Elder's large library, benefiting from the acquisition.

== Manuscript tradition ==
Like most other surviving ancient texts, Pliny's letters survive only through copies made hundreds of years later, which differ slightly in their readings from each other. These manuscript copies are the result of a process that has been described as "as complicated as it is fascinating." The letters have been categorized into two families: the nine-book tradition (which contain the letters Pliny had prepared for publication), and the ten-book tradition (which includes the book containing the letters between Pliny and Trajan collected from the imperial archives).

The ten-book tradition depends on a manuscript transcribed towards the end of the fifth century; it survived almost complete down to the 16th century when it suffered great losses; its surviving six leaves are now at the Morgan Library & Museum in New York City (manuscript M.462). One 11th century copy, which contains the first 100 letters of the Epistulae, was widely copied through central France and Normandy during the next centuries, successfully "establishing its 100 letters as the vulgate text of Pliny." Scholars proceeded to supplement this text from manuscripts of the nine-book tradition.

The nine-book tradition is primarily reconstructed from these borrowings; few manuscripts have survived into modern times that present pure examples of this tradition. One is a lost manuscript, missing book 8 of Epistulae, that had been preserved from ancient times in the Chapter Library of Verona and survived down to the 15th century; while no complete copy exists of this manuscript, a selection of 167 letters from the 218 in this manuscript survives as Holkham Hall 396. Two more manuscripts, one written at Corbie Abbey, the other at the Princely Abbey of Fulda, represent a second branch of the nine-book tradition; the Fulda manuscript (known as Florence, Laur. 47.36 = M) is the most complete representative of the nine-book tradition. A third branch is known only from borrowings used to fill lacunae the other two branches, primarily for 8.1-8.8.2 (it lacks the balance of book 8) and 9.16.

== Books 1–9 ==
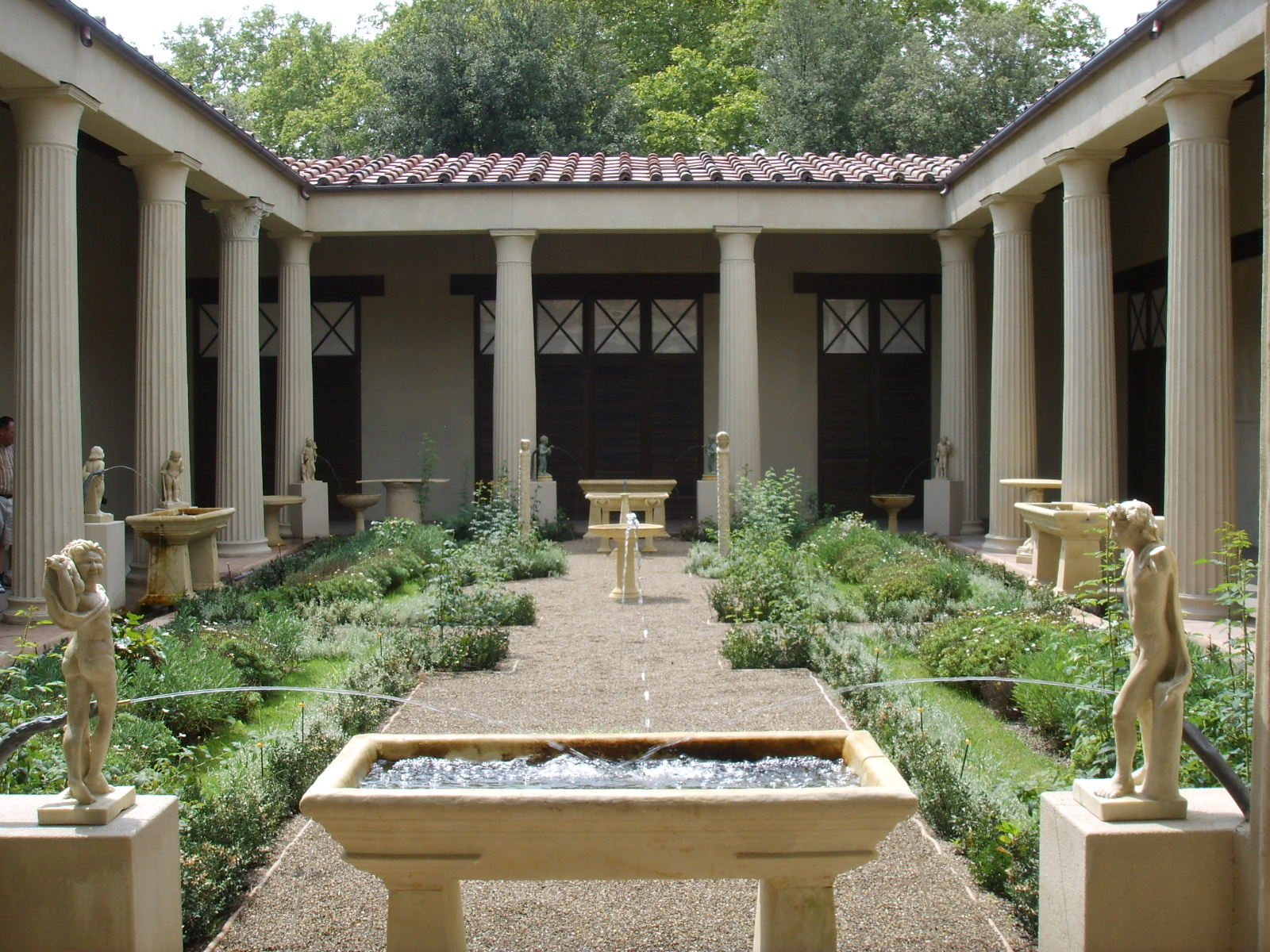
Reconstruction of the Roman garden of the House of the Vettii in Pompeii

As already mentioned above, highlights of these books include Pliny's description of the eruption of Mount Vesuvius and the death of his uncle and mentor, Pliny the Elder. The first letter (1.1), addressed to Gaius Septicius Clarus, is also notable for giving Pliny's reasons for collecting his letters. Those that give details of Pliny's life at his country villas are important documents in the history of garden design. They are the world's oldest sources of the information on how gardens were used in the ancient world and the considerations that went into their design.

The content of this section of the letters evolves over time. Pliny's career as a young man is very fully described in the earlier letters, which include tributes to notable figures such as the epigrammatist Martial, Pliny's protégé (3.21). Advice is offered to friends, references are given, political support is discussed and Pliny comments on many other aspects of Roman life, using established literary style. However, by the last two books the subject matter is more contemplative.

Chronologically, it is suggested that Books 1 to 3 were written between 97 and 102, Books 4 to 7 were composed between 103 and 107 and Books 8 and 9 cover 108 and 109. These books were probably intermittently published between 99 and 109.

=== Eruption of Mount Vesuvius ===
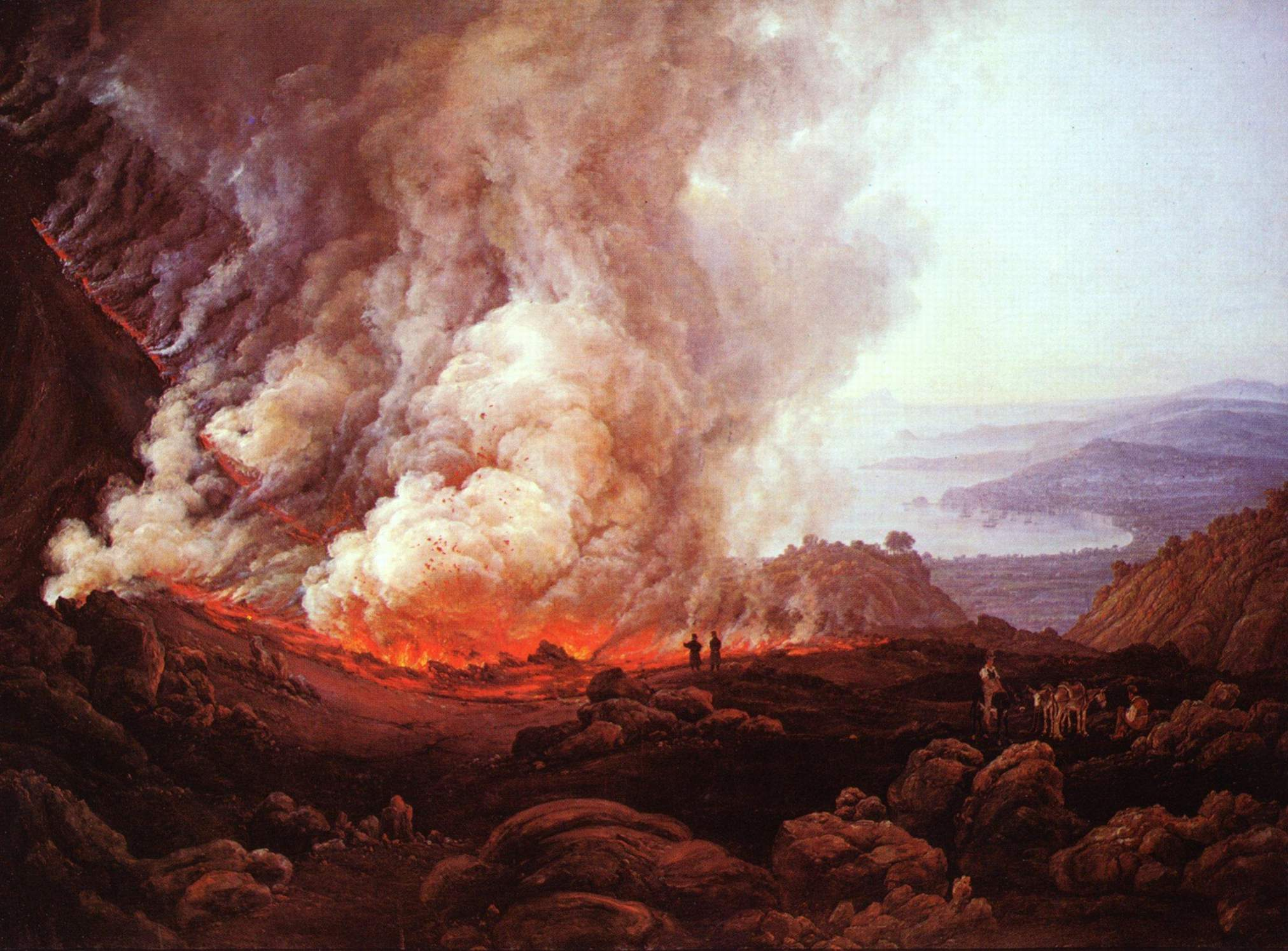
Eruption of Vesuvius. Painting by Norwegian painter I.C. Dahl (1826)

In his letter Pliny relates the first warning of the eruption:

My uncle was stationed at Misenum, in active command of the fleet. On (several dates are given in the copies), in the early afternoon, my mother drew his attention to a cloud of unusual size and appearance. He had been out in the sun, had taken a cold bath, and lunched while lying down, and was then working at his books. He called for his shoes and climbed up to a place that would give him the best view of the phenomenon. It was not clear at that distance from which mountain the cloud was rising (it was afterwards known to be Vesuvius); its general appearance can best be expressed as being like a pine-tree, for it rose to a great height on a sort of trunk and then split off into branches, I imagine because it was thrust upwards by the first blast and then left unsupported as the pressure subsided, or else it was borne down by its own weight so that it spread out and gradually dispersed. Sometimes it looked white, sometimes blotched and dirty, according to the amount of soil and ashes it carried with it. My uncle's scholarly acumen saw at once that it was important enough for a closer inspection. Pliny, Epistulae VI.16.

Pliny then goes on to describe his uncle's failed attempt to study further the eruption and to save the lives of refugees, using the fleet under his command. Pliny's two letters regarding the eruption were written to the historian Tacitus, a close friend, who had requested from Pliny a detailed account of his uncle's death for inclusion in his own historical work.

Vulcanologists call the type of eruption that Pliny described "Plinian".

== Book 10 ==
The letters of Book 10 are addressed to or from the Emperor Trajan in their entirety, and it is generally assumed that we have received them verbatim. As such, they offer a unique insight into the administrative functions of a Roman province of the time, as well as the machinations of the Roman system of patronage and wider cultural mores of Rome itself. In addition, the corruption and apathy that occurred at various levels of the provincial system can be seen clearly. The letters also contain the earliest external account of Christian worship, and reasons for the execution of Christians.

The letter regarding Christians deserves mention because its contents were, in the view of many historians, to become the standard policy toward Christians for the rest of the pagan era. Taken together, Pliny's letter and Trajan's response constituted a severe policy toward Christians. Although Christians were not to be sought out, they were to be executed if brought before a magistrate by a reputable means of accusation (no anonymous charges were permitted) and they were sometimes given the opportunity to recant.

Trajan's replies to Pliny's queries and requests were also collected for publication, making the anthology even more valuable. The letters thus allow us a glimpse of the personalities of both Pliny and Trajan.

== Editions ==
The editio princeps of the Epistulae, edited by L. Carbo and published in Venice in 1471, was based on one of the manuscripts in the nine-book tradition. In May 1502, after five editions of Pliny's nine books had been published, Hieronymus Avantius of Verona brought out an incomplete and corrupt version of book 10, containing numerous errors and misspellings and omitting the first 26 letters. The first complete edition which included book 10 was prepared by Aldus Manutius, who used a surviving 5th-century manuscript found at the abbey of Saint-Victor (six leaves of which survives as the Morgan Library & Museum manuscript M.462), and published in Venice in 1508. The best modern edition of the Epistulae is considered to be Sir Roger Mynors' Oxford edition, published in 1963.

== Selected readings in Latin ==
To Tacitus, on Fame and Posterity

To Emperor Trajan, concerning the Christians

To Tacitus, on Nature and Study

== See also ==
- Epistle
- Letter
