= Titus Prifernius Paetus Rosianus Geminus =

Titus Prifernius Paetus Rosianus Geminus was a Roman senator of the second century who held a series of posts in the emperor's service. He was suffect consul for the nundinium of May–June AD 146 as the colleague of Publius Mummius Sisenna Rutilianus.

== Life ==
Paetus was born in Trebula Mutusca to a senatorial family with many connections. His father, Titus Prifernius Paetus Rosianus Geminus, was suffect consul in 123, and his grandfather, Titus Prifernius Paetus, was suffect consul in 96. His family was prestigious not only on the wider level but also on the local; Paetus is recorded holding all of the municipal posts of his home city.

The first recorded office Paetus held was as one of the decemviri stlitibus judicandus, one of the four magistracies that comprised the vigintiviri. Then in the late 20s of the second century he served as military tribune in the Legio X Fretensis, stationed in Judea. Upon returning to Rome, he held the traditional Roman magistracies -- quaestor, plebeian tribune and praetor—all with the recommendation of the emperor Hadrian. Edward Dabrowa attributes this favor to the intercession of either his father or the well-known lawyer and friend of the Emperor, his brother-in-law Publius Pactumeius Clemens. According to Ronald Syme, Clemens was quaestor to Paetus' father, when he was proconsular governor of Africa.

After serving as praetor, Paetus went on to be legatus legionis or commander of a legion whose name has not been preserved (the two most likely units are Legio XIV Gemina or Legio IV Scythica), then governor of Gallia Aquitania; Géza Alföldy offers the dates for this office as from around 142 to 145. Dabrowa notes, "This post was of great significance because at that time it promised a swift promotion to consulship." He became suffect consul a year after his return to Rome.

After the consulship, Paetus was admitted to the collegium of augurs. He also held a series of consular offices: curator alvei Tiberis et cloacarum Urbis, praefectus alimentorum; then two governorships, that of Dalmatia from 153 to 156, and the pinnacle of senatorial success, proconsular governor of Africa in 160/161.

Political offices
| Preceded by Quintus Licinius Modestinus Attius Labeo, and Gnaeus Claudius Severus Arabianus | Suffect consul of the Roman Empire; 146 with Publius Mummius Sisenna Rutilianus | Succeeded by Gnaeus Terentius Homullus Junior, and Lucius Aurelius Gallus |
