= Sextus Erucius Clarus =

Roman senator and prefect (died 146)

Sextus Erucius Clarus (died March 146) was a Roman senator and aristocrat. He was Urban prefect and twice consul, the second time for the year AD 146. Clarus was the nephew of Gaius Septicius Clarus, a friend of Pliny the Younger.

Erucius Clarus was also a friend of Pliny, who assisted him in obtaining from the Emperor Trajan the latus clavus, allowing him to hold the office of quaestor; Ronald Syme dates when he held the magistracy as between the years 99 and 101. A letter from Pliny to Lucius Domitius Apollinaris (suffect consul 97) exists where the former asks the latter to help Clarus in his pursuit of the office of plebeian tribune. Clarus is also the addressee of a letter from Pliny. Aulus Gellius writes of Clarus as a contemporary, stating that he was very devoted to the study of ancient literature.

Syme notes that after all of this attention to Clarus in the early stages of his career, and to his uncle, "Pliny seems to have forgotten about him." Darkness descends on Clarus until the year 116 when Cassius Dio reports two of the leading generals of the emperor Trajan, Clarus and Julius Alexander, capturing the city of Seleucia. As a reward, both were appointed suffect consuls; the date of this first consulship was estimated by Géza Alföldy as around 117. However, through the reign of Hadrian there is no "record of any consular province, no sign of his existence all through the twenty-one years." It is not until the reign of Hadrian's successor that Clarus receives further appointments, namely his second consulship.

Clarus died in 146 while simultaneously holding the posts of consul ordinarius and urban prefect. He was replaced as consul by Quintus Licinius Modestinus and as urban prefect by Quintus Lollius Urbicus.

A likely descendant, either son or grandson, is the consul of 170, Gaius Erucius Clarus.

Political offices
Preceded by Gaius Fadius Rufus, and Publius Vicrius as consules suffecti	Consul of the Roman Empire; 146 with Gnaeus Claudius Severus Arabianus	Succeeded by Quintus Licinius Modestinus Attius Labeo, and Gnaeus Claudius Severus Arabianus
