= Publius Mummius Sisenna Rutilianus =

2nd century Roman senator, legate and consul

Publius Mummius Sisenna Rutilianus was a Roman senator of the second century AD. He is best known from Lucian's vivid portrayal of him in Alexander vel Pseudomantis, where the senator is described as "a man of good family and tested in many Roman offices, but utterly sick as far as the gods were concerned," as the most distinguished victim of the bogus oracle established by the story's namesake in Paphlagonia. Rutilianus was suffect consul in the nundinium of May-June 146 with Titus Prifernius Paetus Rosianus Geminus as his colleague.

== Life ==
Anthony Birley states he was "probably" the son of Publius Mummius Sisenna, consul ordinarius of 133. Two surviving inscriptions from Tivoli document his cursus honorum. Rutilianus started his senatorial career as one of the decemviri stlitibus judicandis, one of the four boards that form the vigintiviri; membership in one of these four boards was a preliminary and required first step toward a gaining entry into the Roman Senate. Then he was commissioned a military tribune in Legio V Macedonica, then stationed in Moesia Inferior. Next he was elected a quaestor, and upon completion of this traditional Republican magistracy Rutilianus would be enrolled in the Senate. Two more traditional Republican magistracies followed: plebeian tribune and praetor.

After completing his term as praetor, Rutilianus likely served as legatus legionis for Legio VI Victrix, stationed in Roman Britain, under his father who was governor of the province c.133-135/138?. "Such close links between governors and legionary legates were abnormal," notes Birley, "but they could be interpreted as a sign of favour from Hadrian." His next post was prefect of the aerarium Saturni or Senate treasury, which he held for three years; Mireille Corbier dates his tenure from the year 141 to 143 with Lucius Coelius Festus as his colleague. At some point prior to his consulate Rutilianus was accepted into the collegium of Augurs, which Birley notes, confirms his "high social standing."

After stepping down from his consulate, Rutilianus held at least two offices. The first was an appointment as governor of the imperial province of Moesia inferior as the immediate predecessor of Gaius Curtius Justus, who is considered to have entered the governorship in 156. However, Géza Alföldy places Marcus Valerius Etruscus as Justus' predecessor and instead dates Rutilianus between the years 146 and 155, perhaps between the years 149 and 152. The second office was proconsular governor of Asia, the apex of a successful Senatorial career, which Ronald Syme dates to the term 160/161.

== Rutilianus and the oracle ==
The proconsular province of Asia.

Alexander of Abonoteichus had established an oracle of Glycon in Western Asia Minor, whose fame eventually extended beyond Bithynia, Galatia, and Thrace to Italy and Rome. Rutilianus had been drawn to the oracle, ostensibly to serve his term as proconsul of Asia, but instead, "he very nearly abandoned the office entrusted to him in order to take wing to Abonoteichus." Lucian explains that Rutilianus, "though a man of birth and breeding, put to the proof in many Roman offices, nevertheless in all that concerned the gods was very infirm and held strange beliefs about them. If he but saw anywhere a stone smeared with holy oil or adorned with a wreath, he would fall on his face forthwith, kiss his hand, and stand beside it for a long time making vows and craving blessings from it."

Shortly after Rutilianus had been caught up in this oracle, Lucian had taken a personal interest in debunking it and paid a visit to Alexander. By this point Rutilianus had asked the oracle whom he should marry, the response was that the proconsul, who was in his sixties, should marry Alexander's daughter, allegedly engendered on the goddess Selene. Lucian attempted to dissuade the proconsul from taking the girl in marriage, but by this time Rutilianus was credulous of all the claims of the oracle and would not listen to him. Taking his leave, Lucian discovered that the crew of the boat Alexander had loaned him to take him home had been ordered to murder him, and avoided this fate by changing ships. In response, Lucian decided to prosecute Alexander in court, but when he presented his case to the governor of Bithynia et Pontus, Lucius Hedius Rufus Lollianus Avitus, the latter convinced him that it would be futile, for even if Lucian won his case Rutilianus would use his influence to prevent Alexander from being punished.

Political offices
Preceded by Quintus Licinius Modestinus Attius Labeo, and Gnaeus Claudius Severus Arabianus	Suffect consul of the Roman Empire; 146 with Titus Prifernius Paetus Rosianus Geminus	Succeeded by Gnaeus Terentius Homullus Junior, and Lucius Aurelius Gallus
