= Gaius Septicius Clarus =

Praetorian prefect to Roman Emperor Hadrian

Gaius Septicius Clarus (fl. 2nd century CE), was a prefect of the Roman imperial bodyguard (better known as the Praetorian Guard) and influential as a friend and supporter of famous Silver Age authors Pliny the Younger and Suetonius.

== Praetorian prefect ==
Little is known of Septicius Clarus' early career but soon after Hadrian became emperor he was considered capable and experienced enough to be appointed to the position of Praetorian Prefect, replacing Servius Sulpicius Similis in c. 119 CE. This was one of the most powerful positions in the Roman administration. However, a few years later (c. 122 CE) Septicius was dismissed from his post as prefect after Hadrian alleged he had been treating the empress Vibia Sabina "in a more informal fashion than the etiquette of the court demanded." His friend the imperial secretary Suetonius was dismissed for the same reason.

== Literary connections ==
In the first letter of his famous collection of correspondence, the Epistulae, Pliny the Younger credits Septicius’ constant urgings for motivating him to publish his letters. The intimate friendship between the two is evident in another letter where Pliny playfully chides Septicius for not appearing at a lavish dinner party. In another letter, to Apollinaris, Pliny writes of Septicius Clarus: "I never met anyone more sterling, simple, frank, and trustworthy."

Septicius Clarus was also a friend of the historian Suetonius who dedicated his famous collection of biographies of the early emperors, The Twelve Caesars, to him.

== Family ==
Septicius’ family was prominent in 2nd Century CE Rome. His brother Marcus Erucius Clarus was suffect consul in 117 CE and conquered and burned the city of Seleucia during Trajan's eastern campaign. His nephew Sextus Erucius Clarus was twice consul and also City Prefect.
