= Gnaeus Claudius Severus Arabianus =

2nd century Roman senator and philosopher

Gnaeus Claudius Severus Arabianus (113 – after 176) was a senator and philosopher who lived in the Roman Empire.

== Life ==
Severus was the son of the consul and first Roman Governor of Arabia Petraea, Gaius Claudius Severus, by a mother whose name is unknown. Severus was of Pontian Greek descent. He was born and raised in Pompeiopolis, a city in the Roman province of Galatia.

When Severus had come to Rome during the reign of Emperor Hadrian (117-138), he had become a philosophical mentor and a teacher to Roman noble students. Among his students was the future Emperor Marcus Aurelius, with whom he had become friends.

In Rome, Severus assumed a reputation as a man of spirit and as a great philosophical mentor. He was a follower of peripatetic philosophy and later served as an ordinary consul in 146 in the reign of Antoninus Pius (138-161).

He married a woman, name unknown, and they had a son called Gnaeus Claudius Severus. Severus was evidently a politician with a deep interest in political philosophy, as evidenced by Marcus Aurelius’ opinion of him in Meditations (1.14n):

From Severus: love of family, love of truth, love of justice; to have come by his help to understand Thrasea, Helvidius, Cato, Dio Brutus; to have conceived the idea of a balanced constitution, a commonwealth based on equality and freedom of speech, and of a monarchy which values above all the liberty of the subject; from him, too, a constant and vigorous respect for philosophy; beneficence, unstinting generosity, optimism; his confidence in the affection of his friends, his frankness with those who met with his censure, and open likes and dislikes, so that his friends did not need to guess at his wishes.

== Sources ==
- From Tiberius to the Antonines: a history of the Roman Empire AD 14-192, by Albino Garzetti, 1974
- Marcus Aurelius, by Anthony Richard Birley, Routledge, 2000
- The Cambridge Ancient History: the High Empire, A.D. 70-192, by Alan K. Bowman, Peter Garnsey, Dominic Rathbone Edition: 2 - Item notes: v. 11 - 2000
- Marcus Aurelius - Meditations

Political offices
Preceded by Gaius Fadius Rufus, and Publius Vicrius as consules suffecti	Consul of the Roman Empire; 146 with Sextus Erucius Clarus II, followed by Quintus Licinius Modestinus Attius Labeo	Succeeded by Publius Mummius Sisenna Rutilianus, and Titus Prifernius Paetus Rosianus Geminus
