= Suetonius =

Roman historian (c. AD 69 – after AD 122)

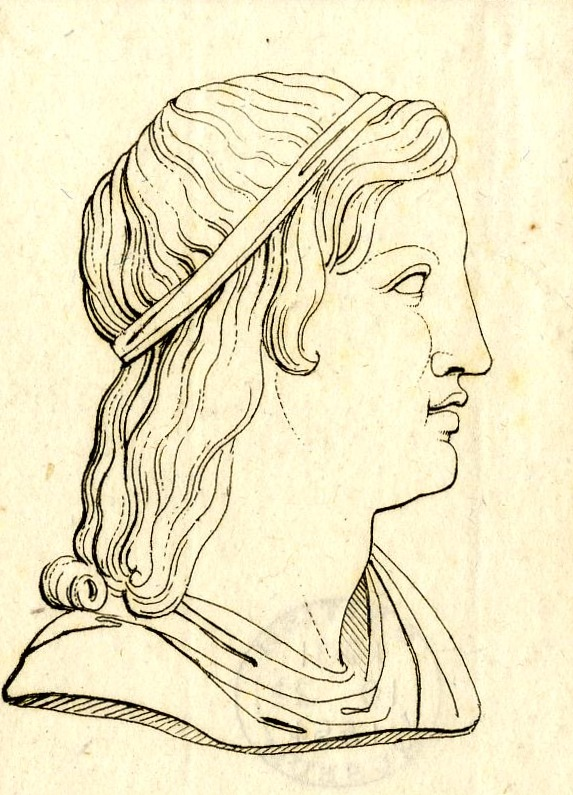
- 19th-century etching of Suetonius
- Born: Gaius Suetonius Tranquillus c. AD 69; Hippo Regius, Africa (modern Annaba, Algeria)
- Died: After c. AD 122 (aged 53)
- Occupations: Secretary, historian
- Writing career
- Genre: Biography
- Subjects: History, biography, oratory
- Notable work: The Twelve Caesars
- Movement: Silver Age of Latin

Gaius Suetonius Tranquillus (Latin: [ˈɡaːiʊs sweːˈtoːniʊs traŋˈkᶣɪlːʊs]), commonly referred to as Suetonius (/swɪˈtoʊniəs/ swih-TOH-nee-əs; c. AD 69 – after AD 122), was a Roman historian who wrote during the early Imperial era of the Roman Empire. His most important surviving work is De vita Caesarum, commonly known in English as The Twelve Caesars, a set of biographies of 12 successive Roman rulers from Julius Caesar to Domitian. Other works by Suetonius concerned the daily life of Rome, politics, oratory, and the lives of famous writers, including poets, historians, and grammarians. A few of these books have partially survived, but many have been lost.

== Life ==
Gaius Suetonius Tranquillus was probably born about AD 69, a date deduced from his remarks describing himself as being about 57 years after Nero's death. His place of birth is disputed, but most scholars place it in Hippo Regius (the modern Annaba), at the time a small north African town in Numidia, in modern-day Algeria. It is certain that Suetonius came from a family of moderate social position, that his father, Suetonius Laetus, was a tribune belonging to the equestrian order (tribunus angusticlavius) in Legio XIII Gemina, and that Suetonius was educated when schools of rhetoric flourished in Rome.

Suetonius was a close friend of senator and letter-writer Pliny the Younger. Pliny describes him as "quiet and studious, a man dedicated to writing". Pliny helped him buy a small property and interceded with the Emperor Trajan (not Hadrian) to grant Suetonius tax immunities usually granted to a father of three, the ius trium liberorum, because he was childless even though he was married; such tax immunities were also granted to thousands of inhabitants of Italy who were part of the empire at the time of Suetonius and Trajan and at the time...the population of Rome is estimated to have been more than 600,000 people. Through Pliny, Suetonius came into favour with Trajan and Hadrian. Suetonius may have served on Pliny's staff when Pliny was imperial governor (legatus Augusti pro praetore) of Bithynia and Pontus (northern Asia Minor) between 110 and 112. Under Trajan he served as secretary of studies (a studiis (precise functions are uncertain)) and director of Imperial archives (a bibliotecis); while under Hadrian, Suetonius became the emperor's secretary (ab epistulis).

According to the controversial and often unreliable collection of biographies, "The Historia Augusta", written more than 150 years after "The Twelve Caesars", Hadrian later dismissed Suetonius from his position for conducting himself too informally around his wife, the empress Vibia Sabina. "The Twelve Caesars" does not include Hadrian as emperor of Rome and the Roman senate at the time of Hadrian's death was less willing to deify Hadrian.

== Works ==
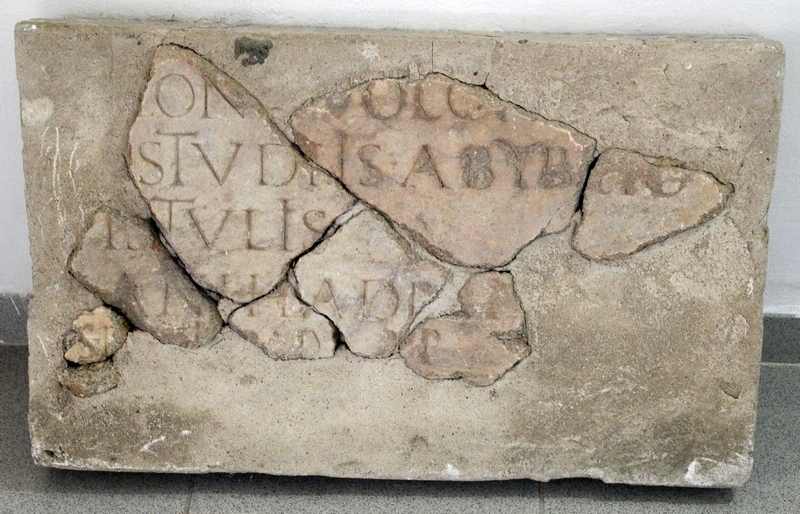
Inscription dedicated to Suetonius from his hometown Annaba (now in Algeria), Museum of Hippo Regius, ca. 125 AD

=== The Twelve Caesars ===
Suetonius is mainly remembered as the author of De Vita Caesarum—translated as The Life of the Caesars, although a more common English title is The Lives of the Twelve Caesars or simply The Twelve Caesars—his only extant work except for the brief biographies and other fragments noted below. The Twelve Caesars, probably written in Hadrian's time, is a collective biography of the Roman Empire's first leaders, Julius Caesar (the first few chapters are missing), Augustus, Tiberius, Caligula, Claudius, Nero, Galba, Otho, Vitellius, Vespasian, Titus and Domitian. The book was dedicated to his friend Gaius Septicius Clarus, a prefect of the Praetorian Guard in 119. The work tells the tale of each Caesar's life according to a set formula: the descriptions of appearance, omens, family history, quotes, and then a history are given in a consistent order. He recorded the earliest accounts of Julius Caesar's epileptic seizures.

=== Other works ===
==== Partly extant ====
- De Viris Illustribus ("On Famous Men"—in the field of literature), to which belong:
  - De Illustribus Grammaticis ("Lives of the Grammarians"; 20 brief lives, apparently complete)
  - De Claris Rhetoribus ("Lives of the Rhetoricians"; 5 brief lives out of an original 16 survive)
  - De Poetis ("Lives of the Poets"; the life of Virgil, as well as fragments from the lives of Terence, Horace and Lucan, survive)
  - De Historicis ("Lives of the historians"; a brief life of Pliny the Elder is attributed to this work)
- Peri ton par' Hellesi paidion ("Greek Games")
- Peri blasphemion ("Greek Terms of Abuse")

The two last works were written in Greek. They apparently survive in part in the form of extracts in later Greek glossaries.

==== Lost works ====
The following list of Suetonius's lost works is from Robert Graves's foreword to his translation of the Twelve Caesars.

- Royal Biographies
- Lives of Famous Whores
- Roman Manners and Customs
- The Roman Year
- The Roman Festivals
- Roman Dress
- Greek Games
- Offices of State
- On Cicero's Republic
- Physical Defects of Mankind
- Methods of Reckoning Time
- An Essay on Nature
- Greek Objurations
- Grammatical Problems
- Critical Signs Used in Books

The introduction to the Loeb edition of Suetonius, translated by J. C. Rolfe, with an introduction by K. R. Bradley, references the Suda with the following titles:

- On Greek games
- On Roman spectacles and games
- On the Roman year
- On critical signs in books
- On Cicero's Republic
- On names and types of clothes
- On insults
- On Rome and its customs and manners

The volume adds other titles not testified within the Suda.

- On famous courtesans
- On kings
- On the institution of offices
- On physical defects
- On weather signs
- On names of seas and rivers
- On names of winds

Two other titles may also be collections of some of the aforelisted:

- Pratum (Miscellany)
- On various matters

== Editions ==
- Robert Graves (trans.), Suetonius: The Twelve Caesars (Harmondsworth, Middlesex, England: Penguin Books, Ltd, 1957)
- J. C. Rolfe (trans.), Lives of the Caesars, Volume I (Loeb Classical Library 31, Harvard University Press, 1997).
- J. C. Rolfe (trans.), Lives of the Caesars, Volume II (Loeb Classical Library 38, Harvard University Press, 1998).
- Edwards, Catherine Lives of the Caesars. Oxford World's Classics. (Oxford University Press, 2008).
- Donna W. Hurley (trans.), Suetonius: The Caesars (Indianapolis/London: Hackett Publishing Company, 2011).
- C. Suetonii Tranquilli De vita Caesarum libros VIII et De grammaticis et rhetoribus librum, ed. Robert A. Kaster (Oxford: 2016).
- Suetonius (2025). The Lives of the Caesars. Translated by Holland, Tom. Penguin Classics. ISBN 978-0-241-18689-3.
- Pauline Duchêne & Phoebe Garrett (ed. and trans.), Suetonius: The Fragments (Translated Texts from Antiquity 2, Liverpool University Press, 2025).

== See also ==
- Suetonius on Christians
