= Symmachus =

Symmachus is a name from Roman antiquity. It may refer to:

- Symmachus (translator) (late 2nd century), author of one of the Greek versions of the Old Testament
- Symmachus ben Joseph, a Jewish Tanna sage of the fifth generation
- Symmachus (consul 522), son of Boethius
- Pope Symmachus, bishop of Rome from 498 to 514
- Symmachi, a Roman aristocratic family
  - Aurelius Valerius Tullianus Symmachus, consul in 330
  - Lucius Aurelius Avianius Symmachus, praefectus urbi in 364–365
  - Quintus Aurelius Symmachus (c. 340–c. 402), orator, author, and politician, the most influential of the Symmachi
  - Quintus Fabius Memmius Symmachus (383/384 – after 402), praetor
  - Quintus Aurelius Symmachus, consul in 446
  - Quintus Aurelius Memmius Symmachus (died 526), consul in 485 and wrote a history of Rome
