= Persecution of pagans under Theodosius I =

Late 4th century Roman religious persecution

The persecution of pagans under Theodosius I began in 381, after the first couple of years of his reign as co-emperor in the eastern part of the Roman Empire. In the 380s, Theodosius I reiterated the ban of Constantine the Great on animal sacrifices, prohibited haruspicy on animal sacrifice, pioneered the criminalization of magistrates who did not enforce anti-pagan laws, broke up some pagan associations and destroyed pagan temples.

Between 389 and 391, he issued the "Theodosian decrees", which established a practical ban on paganism; visits to the temples were forbidden, the remaining pagan holidays were abolished, the sacred fire in the Temple of Vesta in the Roman Forum was extinguished as the Vestal Virgins were disbanded, and auspices and witchcraft were deemed punishable offenses. Theodosius refused to restore the Altar of Victory in the Senate House, as requested by pagan Senators.

In 392, he became emperor of the whole empire (the last one to be so). From this moment until the end of his reign in 395, while pagans remained outspoken in their demands for toleration, he authorized or participated in the destruction of many temples, holy sites, images and objects of piety throughout the empire in actions by Christians against major pagan sites. He issued a comprehensive law that prohibited any public pagan ritual and was particularly oppressive of Manicheans. He is likely to have suppressed the Ancient Olympic Games, whose last record of celebration is 393.

== Initial tolerance (379–381) ==
Theodosius I was relatively tolerant towards pagans in the early part of his reign, since he needed the support of the influential pagan ruling class and the percentage of non-Christians in the general population was still quite large, perhaps 50% overall. This was especially true in the West, where the Church was still largely an urban phenomenon except in North Africa. He voiced his support for the preservation of temples or pagan statues as useful public buildings. He is known to have appointed various pagans to office in the earlier part of his reign. For example, he appointed the pagan Eutolmius Tatianus as the praetorian prefect of Egypt. Theodosius I's relative tolerance for other religions is also indicated by his later order (in 388) for the reconstruction of a Jewish synagogue at Callinicum in Mesopotamia, which had been destroyed by a bishop and his Christian flock. (Note: Ambrose was opposed to this reconstruction and paints a picture of all the dire consequences that he felt would result from this edict.)

Theodosius dealt harshly with Arians, heretics, and Christian apostates. (Note: Theodosius also legislated against private divination.) Later in his reign, he tried to stamp out the last vestiges of paganism with great severity. However, he did not succeed in this. Even though deprived of state and municipal support, bereft of funds and property, the followers of the old religions continued to survive visibly, though under pressure and weakening, into the early 6th century.

== Persecution ==
=== First attempts to inhibit paganism (381–388) ===
His first attempt to inhibit paganism was in 381 when he reiterated Constantine's ban on sacrifice. In 384 he prohibited haruspicy on animal sacrifice, and unlike earlier anti-pagan prohibitions, he made non-enforcement of the law by magistrates a crime. Both Theodosius and Valentinian II formally recognized Maximus in 384. For a time, the pagans enjoyed religious liberty once again, and many distinguished pagans rose to important offices in the state. (Note: For example, in the year 384 Quintus Aurelius Symmachus was Urban Prefect and Vettius Agorius Praetextatus held the post of Praefectus Praetorio Italiae, Illyrici et Africae Iterum. These men were distinguished pagans.) The fact that the temples continued to be cared for and that pagan festivals continued to be celebrated is indicated by a law of 386, which declared that care for the temples and festivals were the exclusive prerogative of the pagans. This law also confirms the right of the priests to perform the traditional pagan rites of the temples. In 387, Theodosius declared war on Maximus after Maximus had driven Valentinian II out of Italy. Maximus was defeated and executed, and the anti-pagan regulations of Gratian were apparently reinstated by Valentinian II.

In 388 Theodosius sent a prefect to Syria, Egypt, and Asia Minor with the aim of breaking up pagan associations and the destruction of their temples. The Serapeum of Alexandria was destroyed during this campaign.

=== Theodosian decrees (389–391) ===
In a series of decrees called the "Theodosian decrees" he progressively declared that those pagan feasts that had not yet been rendered Christian ones were now to be workdays (in 389). In 391, he reiterated the ban of blood sacrifice and decreed "no one is to go to the sanctuaries, walk through the temples, or raise his eyes to statues created by the labor of man" (decree "Nemo se hostiis polluat", Codex Theodosianus xvi.10.10). Also in 391, Valentinian II, who was emperor in the West under the aegis of Theodosius, was advised by Ambrose to issue a law that not only prohibited sacrifices but also forbade anyone from visiting the temples. This again caused turbulence in the West. Valentinian II quickly followed this law with a second one, which declared that pagan temples were to be closed, a law that was viewed as practically outlawing paganism.

After the death of Maximus, Valentinian II, under the aegis of Theodosius, once again assumed the office of emperor in the West. Valentinian II, advised by Ambrose, and in spite of pleas from the pagans, refused to restore the Altar of Victory to the Senate House, or their income to the priests and Vestal Virgins. Valentinian was murdered, possibly by agents of Arbogast whom he had tried to dismiss, and Eugenius, a professor of rhetoric, was proclaimed emperor. The ancestral religious rites were once again performed openly and the Altar of Victory was restored. The temples that were thus closed could be declared "abandoned", as Bishop Theophilus I of Alexandria immediately noted in applying for permission to demolish a site and cover it with a Christian church, an act that must have received general sanction, for mithraea forming crypts of churches, and temples forming the foundations of 5th century churches appear throughout the former Roman Empire.

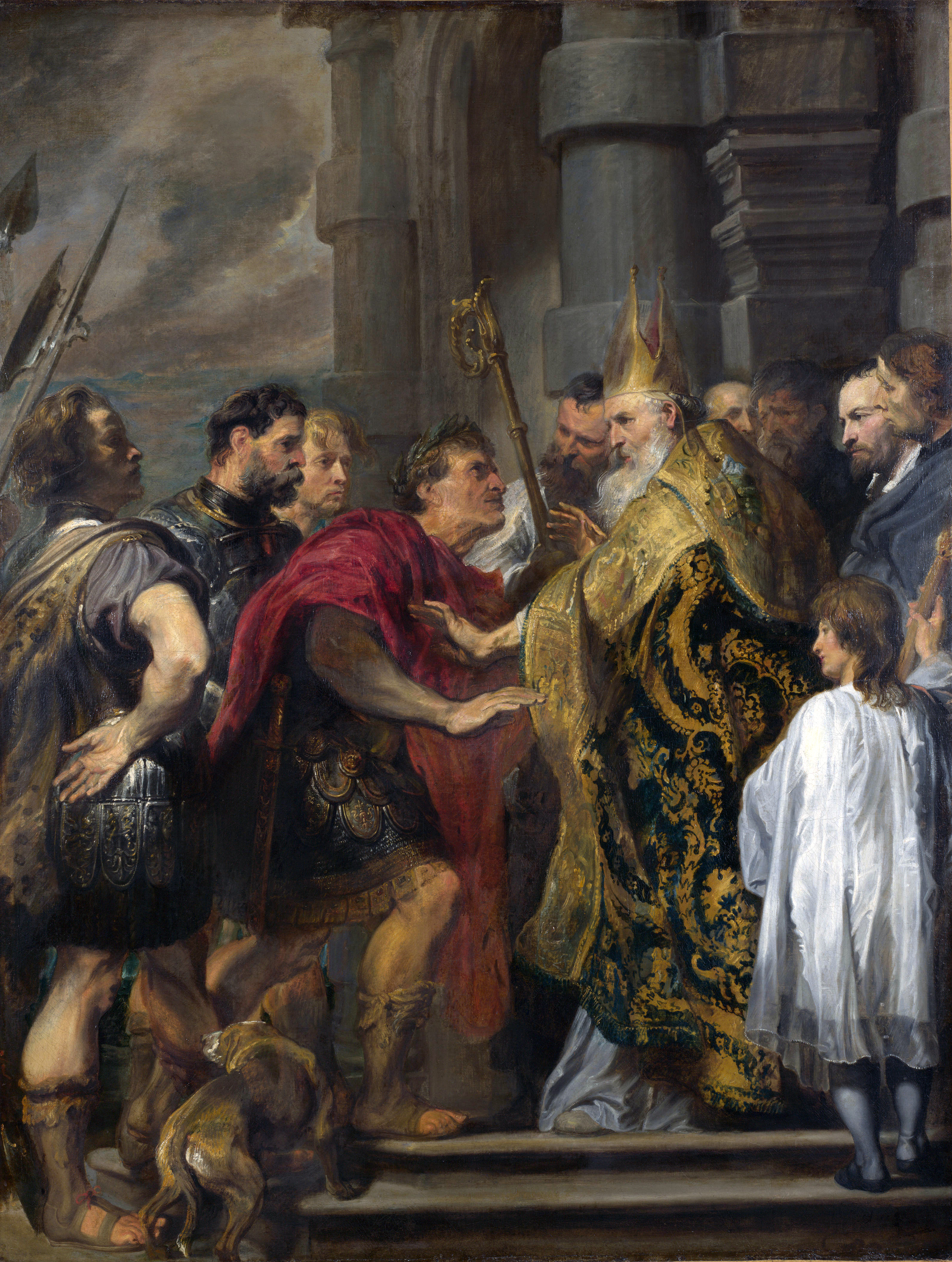
Saint Ambrose and Emperor Theodosius, Anthony van Dyck.

By decree in 391, Theodosius ended the subsidies that had still trickled to some remnants of Greco-Roman civic paganism too. In 394 the eternal fire in the Temple of Vesta in the Roman Forum was extinguished, and the Vestal Virgins were disbanded. Taking the auspices and practicing witchcraft were to be punished. When pagan members of the Senate in Rome appealed to him to restore the Altar of Victory in the Senate House, he refused.

The apparent change of policy that resulted in the "Theodosian decrees" has often been credited to the increased influence of Ambrose, bishop of Milan. Only after what is commonly known as the massacre of Thessalonica in 390 was Ambrose able to gain influence with Theodosius. Ambrose accomplished this by excommunicating Theodosius for ordering the massacre, thereby forcing him to obey.

Some modern historians question the consequences of the laws against pagans. The punishment for venerating man-made pagan images was the forfeiture of an individual's house. An individual's punishment for sacrificing in temples or shrines was a fine of twenty-five pounds of gold

In 391 in Alexandria in the wake of the great anti-pagan riots "busts of Serapis which stood in the walls, vestibules, doorways and windows of every house were all torn out and annihilated..., and in their place the sign of the Lord's cross was painted in the doorways, vestibules, windows and walls, and on pillars."

=== War on paganism (392–395) ===
Rome was more pagan than Christian up until the 390s; Gaul, Spain and northern Italy, in all but the urban areas, were pagan, save Milan which remained half pagan.

In 392, Theodosius become Emperor of also the western part of the Roman Empire, the last emperor to rule over both. In the same year he officially began to proscribe the practice of paganism. This was when he authorized the destruction of many temples throughout the empire.

==== Actions against major pagan sites ====
Theodosius participated in actions by Christians against major pagan sites: the destruction of the gigantic Serapeum by soldiers in 391, according to the Christian sources authorized by Theodosius (extirpium malum) needs to be seen against a complicated background of less spectacular violence in the city: Eusebius mentions street-fighting in Alexandria between Christians and non-Christians as early as 249, and non-Christians had participated in the struggles for and against Athanasius in 341 and 356. "In 363 they killed Bishop George for repeated acts of pointed outrage, insult, and pillage of the most sacred treasures of the city." In 391 riots broke out between supporters of Theodosius's Imperial Prefect and the supporters of the independent Patriarch of Alexandria as to who really governed in Alexandria; the rioters opposing the patriarch took refuge in the Serapeum and used it as a fortress; when order was restored the prefect ordered it demolished so future rioters could not use it for the same purpose.

In 386, Libanius appealed without success to Theodosius to prevent the destruction of a temple in Edessa, and pleaded for toleration and the preservation of the temples against the ongoing attacks of Christian monks, who he claimed:

"hasten to attack the temples with sticks and stones and bars of iron, and in some cases, disdaining these, with hands and feet. Then utter desolation follows, with the stripping of roofs, demolition of walls, the tearing down of statues and the overthrow of altars, and the priests must either keep quiet or die. After demolishing one, they scurry to another, and to a third, and trophy is piled on trophy, in contravention of the law. Such outrages occur even in the cities, but they are most common in the countryside. Many are the foes who perpetrate the separate attacks, but after their countelss crimes this scattered rabble congregates and they are in disgrace unless they have committed the foulest outrage...Temples, Sire, are the soul of the countryside: they mark the beginning of its settlement, and have been passed down through many generations to the men of today. In them the farming communities rest their hopes for husbands, wives, children, for their oxen and the soil they sow and plant. An estate that has suffered so has lost the inspiration of the peasantry together with their hopes, for they believe that their labour will be in vain once they are robbed of the gods who direct their labours to their due end. And if the land no longer enjoys the same care, neither can the yield match what it was before, and, if this be the case, the peasant is the poorer, and the revenue jeopardized."

==== Suppression of pagan rituals, religio illicita ====
Theodosius issued a comprehensive law that prohibited the performance of any type of pagan sacrifice or worship. Theodosius prohibited imperial palace officers and magistrates from honoring their Lares with fire, their Genius with wine, or their Penates with incense. Theodosius also prohibited the practice of all forms of divination, even those forms of divination that were not considered harmful to the welfare of the Emperor, with this wide-ranging law. The laws were particularly hard against the Manicheans who were deprived of the right to make wills or to benefit from them. Manicheans could be sought out by informers, brought to court and in some cases executed. Paganism was now proscribed, a "religio illicita".

==== Suppression from 393 till 395 ====
In 393, Theodosius was ready to begin his war against Eugenius and Arbogastes. The battle that ensued became, in essence, a battle for the survival of paganism. The defeat of Eugenius by Theodosius in 394 led to the final separation of paganism from the state. Theodosius visited Rome to attempt to convert the pagan members of the Senate. Being unsuccessful in this, he withdrew all state funds that had been set aside for the public performance of pagan rites. From this point forward, state funds would never again be made available for the public performance of pagan rites nor for the maintenance of the pagan temples. Despite this setback on their religion, the pagans remained outspoken in their demands for toleration. Many pagans simply pretended to convert as an obvious instrument of advancement.

Theodosius was not the man to sympathise with the balancing policy of the Edict of Milan. He set himself steadfastly to the work of establishing Nicene Christianity as the privileged religion of the state, of repressing dissident Christians (heretics) and of enacting explicit legal measures to abolish paganism in all its phases.

Examples of the destruction of pagan temples in the late fourth century, as recorded in surviving texts, are:

- Martin of Tours' attacks on holy sites in Gaul,
- the destruction of temples in Syria by Marcellus,
- the destruction of temples and images in, and surrounding, Carthage,
- the ruination of the temple at Delphi,
- the desecration of the mystery cult in Eleusis,
- the Patriarch Theophilus who seized and destroyed pagan temples in Alexandria,
- the levelling of all the temples in Gaza
- and the wider destruction of holy sites that spread rapidly throughout Egypt.

This is supplemented in abundance by archaeological evidence in the northern provinces (for which written sources hardly survive) exposing broken and burnt out buildings and hastily buried objects of piety. The leader of the Egyptian monks who participated in the sack of temples replied to the victims who demanded back their sacred icons: "I peacefully removed your gods... there is no such thing as robbery for those who truly possess Christ."

After the last Ancient Olympic Games in 393, it is believed that either Theodosius I, or his grandson Theodosius II in 435, suppressed them. In the official records of the Roman Empire, the reckoning of dates by Olympiads soon came to an end. Subsequently, Theodosius portrayed himself on his coins holding the labarum.

According to a Christian historian "Paganism was now dead", though pagans survived and would continue to do so for another three centuries, mainly outside the towns – "rustics chiefly — pagani." Edward Gibbon writes: "The generation that arose in the world after the promulgation of the Imperial laws was attracted within the pale of the Catholic Church: and so rapid, yet so gentle, was the fall of paganism that only twenty-eight years after the death of Theodosius the faint and minute vestiges were no longer visible to the eye of the legislator." Despite the pleas of many pagans for tolerance, Honorius and Arcadius continued the work of their father by enacting more anti-paganism policies.

== Bibliography ==
- Gibbon, Edward (1776–89), The Decline and Fall of the Roman Empire.
- Hebblewhite, M.K. (2020), Theodosius and the Limits of Empire, Routledge.
- Hughes, Philip (1957), The Conversion of the Roman Empire AD 312–427, Studies in Comparative Religion, vol. 3, Birmingham: Catholic Truth Society.
- Kotynski, Edward J. (2006), The Athletics of the Ancient Olympics: A Summary and Research Tool (PDF), archived from the original on 2 January 2013
- MacMullen, Ramsay (1984), Christianizing The Roman Empire AD 100–400, Yale University Press, ISBN 0-300-03642-6.
- Trombley, Frank R. (1993–4). Hellenic Religion and Christianization, c. 370-529. 2 vols. Leiden: Brill; reprint 2014.
- Zosimus (2017), New History, translated by Ronald T. Ridley, Brill, ISBN 9789004344587
