= History of Rome (Livy) =

First-century BC Roman history by Livy

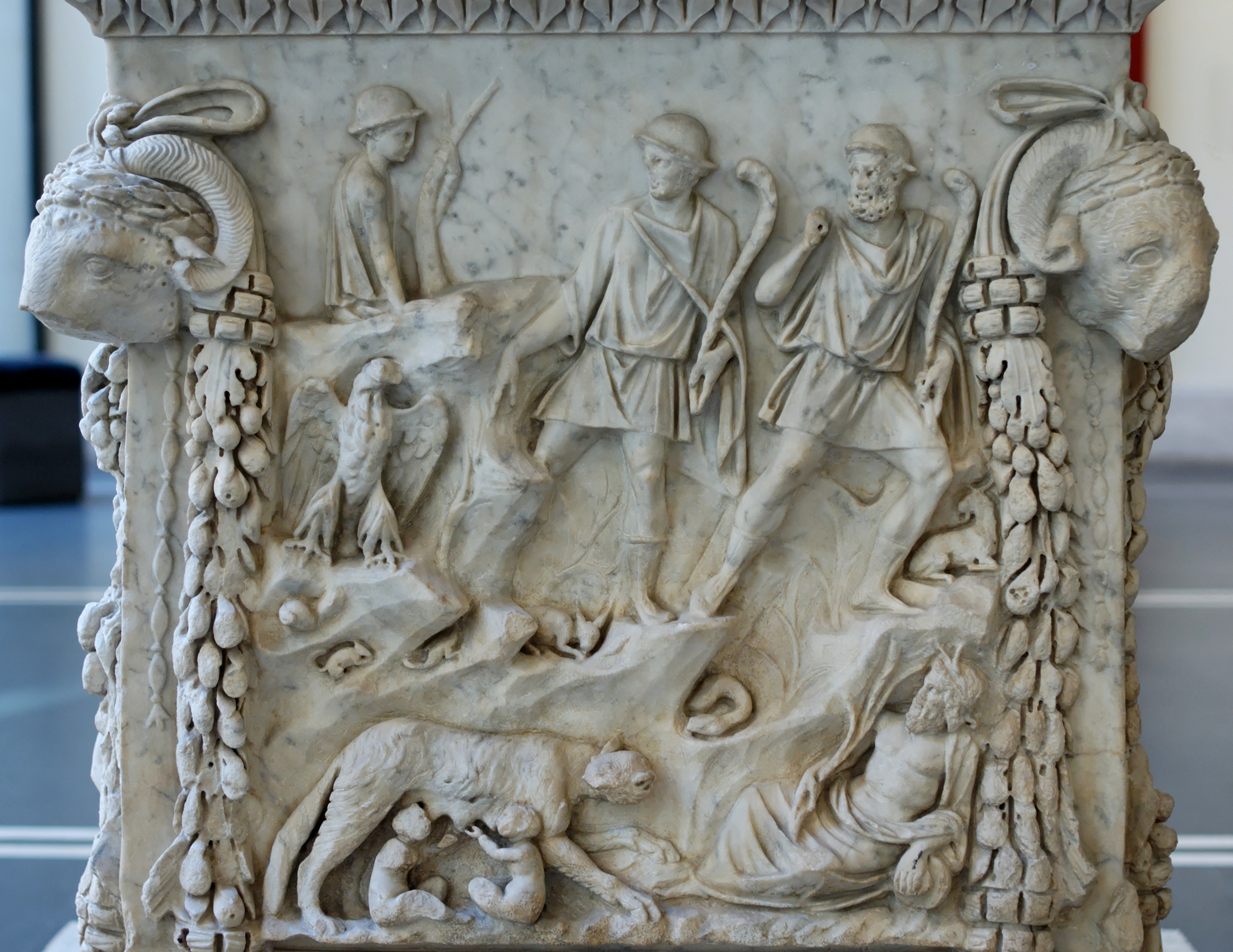
Stories from Livy I.4, on an altar panel from Ostia. Father Tiber looks on at the lower right while the national lupa (wolf) nourishes Romulus and Remus, founders of Rome. The herders are about to find them. One of their goats can be seen. Small animals denote the wildness of the place. The national aquila (eagle) is portrayed.

The History of Rome, perhaps originally titled Annales, and known since late antiquity as Ab Urbe Condita (English: From the Founding of the City), is a monumental history of ancient Rome, written in Latin between 27 and 9 BC by the Roman historian Titus Livius, better known in English as "Livy". (Note: Various indications point to the period from 27 to 20 BC as that during which the first decade was written. In the first book (XIX. 3) the emperor is called Augustus, a title which he was granted by the Roman Senate early in 27, and in IX. 18 the omission of all reference to the restoration, in 20, of the standards taken at Carrhae seems to justify the inference that the passage was written before that date. In the epitome of book LIX, there is a reference to a law of Augustus which was passed in 18.) The work covers the period from the legends concerning the arrival of Aeneas and the refugees from the fall of Troy, to the city's founding in 753 BC, the expulsion of the Kings in 509 BC, and down to Livy's own time, during the reign of the emperor Augustus. (Note: Livy uses the chronology of Varro, one of his predecessors, whose chronology was the most widely accepted in antiquity, and remains in general use today, although scholars continue to debate the dating of specific events, including the founding of Rome itself.) (Note: In Roman times, it was customary to date events according to the consuls of each year, rather than assigning each year a numerical name; so while it was possible to date events by reference to the founding of Rome, this was rarely done. For instance, the consuls of 439 BC were Agrippa Menenius Lanatus and Titus Quinctius Capitolinus Barbatus, so that year would typically be referred to as "the consulship of Agrippa Menenius and Titus Quinctius", rather than "the year three hundred and fifteen". From this custom, the consuls who began each year are sometimes referred to as the eponymous magistrates of that year; that is, the magistrates after whom the year was named.) The last event covered by Livy is the death of Drusus in 9 BC. 35 of 142 books, about a quarter of the work, are still extant. The surviving books deal with the events down to 293 BC (books 1–10), and from 219 to 166 BC (books 21–45).

== Contents ==
=== Corpus ===
The History of Rome originally comprised 142 "books", 35 of which—Books 1–10 with the Preface and Books 21–45—still exist in reasonably complete form. Damage to a manuscript of the 5th century resulted in large gaps (lacunae) in Books 41 and 43–45 (small lacunae exist elsewhere); that is, the material is not covered in any source of Livy's text.

A fragmentary palimpsest of the 91st book was discovered in the Vatican Library in 1772, containing about a thousand words (roughly three paragraphs), and several papyrus fragments of previously unknown material, much smaller, have been found in Egypt since 1900, most recently about 40 words from Book 11, unearthed in 1986.

Some passages are nevertheless known thanks to quotes from ancient authors, the most famous being on the death of Cicero, quoted by Seneca the Elder.

=== Abridgements ===
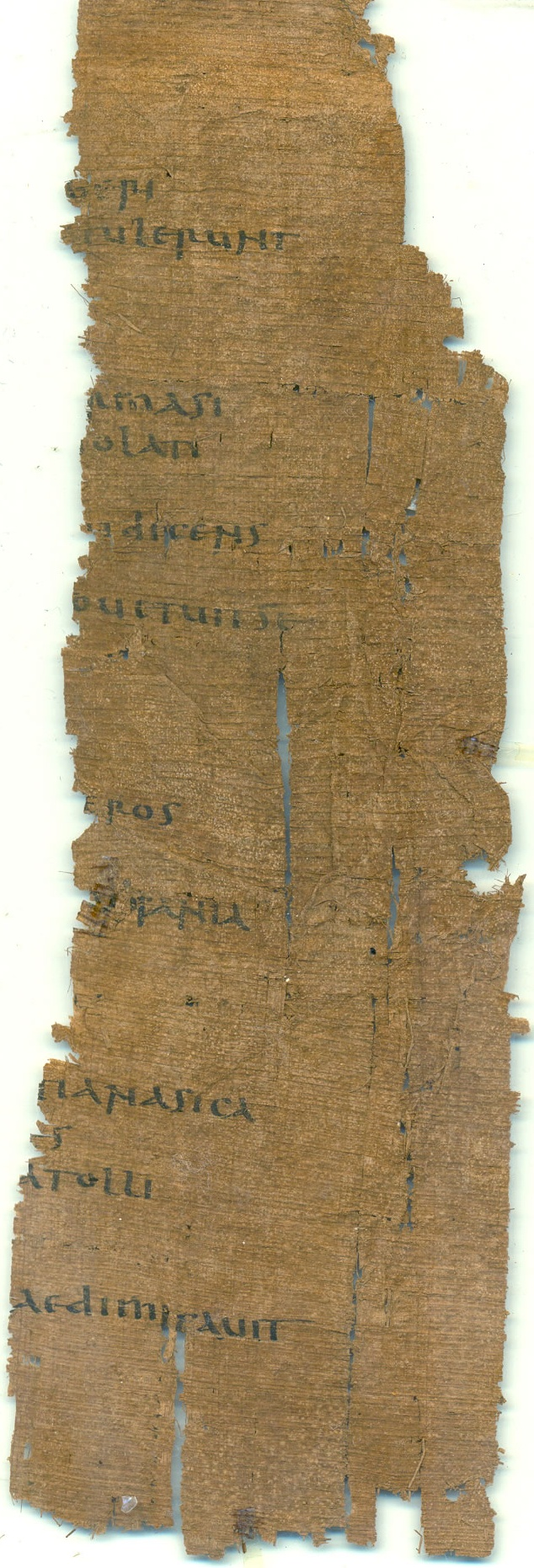
Fragment of P. Oxy. 668, with Epitome of Livy XLVII–XLVIII

Livy was abridged, in antiquity, to an epitome, which survives for Book 1, but was itself abridged in the fourth century into the so-called Periochae, which is simply a list of contents. The Periochae survive for the entire work, except for books 136 and 137.

In Oxyrhynchus, a similar summary of books 37–40, 47–55, and only small fragments of 88 was found on a roll of papyrus that is now in the British Museum classified as P.Oxy.IV 0668. There is another fragment, named P.Oxy.XI 1379, which represents a passage from the first book (I, 6) and that shows a high level of correctness. However, the Oxyrhynchus Epitome is damaged and incomplete.

=== Chronology ===
The entire work covers the following periods:

Books 1–5 – The legendary founding of Rome (including the landing of Aeneas in Italy and the founding of the city by Romulus), the period of the kings, and the early republic down to its conquest by the Gauls in 390 BC. (Note: This is the traditional date, but some uncertainty exists with regard to four years during the Samnite Wars for which no consuls are named in any source, and for which no elections were supposedly held; this has led some scholars to conclude that the Gallic sack of Rome occurred in or about 386 BC, although this also creates an unexplained (and undated) gap before the event.)

Books 6–10 – Wars with the Aequi, Volsci, Etruscans, and Samnites, down to 292 BC.

Books 11–20 – The period from 292 to 218, including the First Punic War (lost).

Books 21–30 – The Second Punic War, from 218 to 202.

Books 31–45 – The Macedonian and other eastern wars from 201 to 167.

Books 46 to 142 are all lost:

Books 46–70 – The period from 167 to the outbreak of the Social War in 91.

Books 71–90 – The civil wars between Marius and Sulla, to the death of Sulla in 78.

Books 91–108 – From 78 BC through the end of the Gallic War, in 50.

Books 109–116 – From the Civil War to the death of Caesar (49–44).

Books 117–133 – The wars of the triumvirs down to the death of Antonius (44–30).

Books 134–142 – The rule of Augustus down to the death of Drusus (9).

=== Table of contents ===
Book number	Status	Years covered	Main events covered
1	Complete	Down to 510 BC	Foundation myths: Aeneas, Ascanius, Romulus and Remus, Rape of the Sabine women; history of the Roman Kingdom, expulsion of Tarquinus Superbus.
2	Complete	509–468 BC	Foundation of the Republic by Brutus, wars against Tarquinius Superbus and Porsena, Secession of the Plebs, Volscian Wars.
3	Complete	467–446 BC	The Decemvirate.
4	Complete	445–404 BC	Conflict of the Orders, murder of Spurius Maelius by Ahala, war against the Fidenates.
5	Complete	403–387 BC	War against Veii, Sack of Rome by Brennus.
6	Complete	387–366 BC	Story of Marcus Manlius Capitolinus, Leges Liciniae Sextiae.
7	Complete	366–342 BC	Stories of Titus Manlius Torquatus and Marcus Valerius Corvus, First Samnite War.
8	Complete	341–322 BC	First Samnite War, Latin War.
9	Complete	321–304 BC	Second Samnite War, defeat of the Caudine Forks, alternate history with Alexander the Great defeated by Rome.
10	Complete	303–293 BC	Third Samnite War, sacrifice of Publius Decius Mus.
11	Fragments (Note: Two small fragments discovered in 1986 in Egypt.)	292–287 BC	Third Samnite War, plague in Rome, Secession of the Plebs.
12	Lost	284–280 BC	War against the Senones, Pyrrhic War, campaigns against the Samnites and Italians, betrayal of Decius Vibullius at Rhegium.
13	Lost	280–278 BC	Pyrrhic War, treaty with Carthage, campaigns against Italic peoples.
14	Lost	278–272 BC	Pyrrhic War, treaty with Ptolemy II, Carthage breaks the treaty with Rome, campaigns against Italic peoples.
15	Lost	272–267 BC	Rome recovers Tarentum and Rhegium. The Picentes, Umbrians and Sallentini submit.
16	Quotes (Note: Maurus Servius Honoratus, In Vergilii Aeneidem Commentarii 1.366, 1.738.)	264–263 BC	First Punic War, first gladiatorial games.
17	Lost	260–256 BC	First Punic War
18	Quote (Note: "I should also mention the snake that Livy talks about in such detail and with such style. He says that in Africa, near the river Bagradas, there was a snake so huge that it was able to prevent the army of Atilius Regulus from using the river. It snatched up many soldiers in its huge mouth... Livy notes that the hide of the beast was sent to our city and measured 120 feet.")	255 BC	First Punic War
19	Quote (Note: Maurus Servius Honoratus, In Vergilii Aeneidem Commentarii 6.198.)	251–241 BC	First Punic War
20	Lost	237–220 BC	Wars against the Faliscans, Sardinians, Corsicans, Illyrians, Gauls, Insubres, and Istrians.
21	Complete	219–218 BC	Second Punic War: Battle of the Trebia.
22	Complete	217–216 BC	Second Punic War, defeats of the Lake Trasimene and Cannae.
23	Complete	216–215 BC	Second Punic War.
24	Complete	215–213 BC	Second Punic War, First Macedonian War.
25	Complete	213–212 BC	Second Punic War, fall of Syracuse.
26	Complete	211–210 BC	Second Punic War, First Macedonian War. Source for The Continence of Scipio.
27	Complete	210–207 BC	Second Punic War, First Macedonian War.
28	Complete	207–205 BC	Second Punic War, First Macedonian War.
29	Complete	205–204 BC	Second Punic War, revolt of Indibilis and Mandonius.
30	Complete	203–201 BC	Second Punic War, Battle of Zama.
31	Complete	201–199 BC	Second Macedonian War.
32	Complete	198–197 BC	Second Macedonian War.
33	Complete	197–195 BC	Second Macedonian War, Battle of Cynoscephalae.
34	Complete	195–194 BC	Lex Oppia repealed, victory of Cato in Hispania, War against Nabis, triumphs of Cato and Flamininus.
35	Complete	193–192 BC	Campaign against the Ligurians, discussion between Scipio Africanus and Hannibal, affairs of Greece, talks with Antiochus III, who then invades Greece.
36	Complete	191 BC	Roman-Seleucid War, Battle of Thermopylae.
37	Complete	190–188 BC	Roman-Seleucid War.
38	Complete	188 BC	Operations in Greece, campaign against the Galatians, Treaty of Apamea, trial and exile of Scipio Africanus.
39	Complete	187–181 BC	The Bacchanalia, causes of the Third Macedonian War, deaths of Scipio Africanus and Hannibal.
40	Complete	184–179 BC	Perseus kills his brother Demetrius, and inherits the kingdom of Macedon. Campaign against the Ligurians.
41	Almost complete	179–174 BC	Campaigns against the Ligurians, Histrians, Sardinians and Celtiberians; Perseus' activities in Greece.
42	Complete	173–171 BC	Third Macedonian War.
43	Almost complete	171–169 BC	Third Macedonian War.
44	Almost complete	169–168 BC	Third Macedonian War, Battle of Pydna.
45	Almost complete	168–166 BC	Third Macedonian War, capture of Perseus, Sixth Syrian War, triumph of Aemilius Paullus.
46	Lost	165–160 BC	Eumenes II's visit to Rome, campaigns in North Italy, embassies to Ptolemy VI and Ptolemy VIII, and Ariarathes V, death of Paullus Aemilius, the Pomptine Marshes are drained.
47	Lost	160–154 BC	Division of Egypt between Ptolemy VI and Ptolemy VIII, support of Ariarathes V against Demetrius I, campaigns against the Dalmatians and Ligurians.
48	Lost	154–150 BC	Origin of the Third Punic War, death of Marcus Aemilius Lepidus, Second Celtiberian War, Lusitanian War.
49	Lost	149 BC	Third Punic War, Lusitanian War, Fourth Macedonian War.
50	Lost	149–147 BC	Prusias II of Bithynia is killed by his son Nicomedes II, death of Massinissa, Third Punic War, Scipio Aemilianus elected consul, Fourth Macedonian War.
51	Lost	147–146 BC	Third Punic War, destruction of Carthage, Achaean War.
52	Lost	146–145 BC	Achaean War, Lusitanian War, war between Alexander Balas and Demetrius II.
53	Lost	143 BC	Lusitanian War.
54	Lost	141–139 BC	Numantine War, Lusitanian War, death of Viriathus.
55	Lost	138–137 BC	Numantine War, murder of Antiochus VI by Diodotus Tryphon.
56	Lost	136–134 BC	Numantine War, First Servile War.
57	Lost	133 BC	Numantine War, campaign of Scipio Aemilianus.
58	Lost	133 BC	Reforms of Tiberius Sempronius Gracchus, his death; First Servile War.
59	Lost	133–129 BC	Numantine War, victory of Scipio Aemilianus; First Servile War, revolt of Eumenes III of Pergamon, war between Antiochus VII and Phraates II, crisis in Egypt, riots in Rome in the aftermath of Tiberius Gracchus' reforms.
60	Lost	126–123 BC	Reforms of Gaius Sempronius Gracchus, Quintus Caecilius Metellus' campaign in the Balearic Islands.
61	Lost	122–120 BC	War against the Gauls, victory of Fabius Maximus Allobrogicus against Bituitus, death of Gaius Gracchus.
62	Lost	118–117 BC	Affairs of Numidia, with a civil war started by Jugurtha.
63	Lost	114–112 BC	Campaigns against the Scordiscians in Thrace, beginning of the Cimbrian War.
64	Lost	112–110 BC	Jugurthine War.
65	Lost	109–107 BC	Jugurthine War, Cimbrian War.
66	Lost	106 BC	Jugurthine War.
67	Lost	105–104 BC	Cimbrian War, Marius' triumph and successive consulships.
68	Lost	103–100 BC	Cimbrian War.
69	Lost	100 BC	Reforms of Saturninus and Glaucia, their deaths.
70	Lost	97–91 BC	Campaign against the Celtiberians, Ptolemy Apion bequeaths his kingdom, Sulla reinstates Ariobarzanes in his kingdom, reforms of Marcus Livius Drusus.
71	Lost	91 BC	Drusus is murdered, Social War.
72	Lost	91 BC	Social War.
73	Lost	90 BC	Social War.
74	Lost	89–88 BC	Social War.
75	Lost	88 BC	Social War.
76	Lost	89–88 BC	Social War, Mithridates conquers Cappadocia and Bithynia.
77	Lost	88 BC	Sulla's march on Rome, First Mithridatic War.
78	Lost	88 BC	First Mithridatic War.
79	Lost	87 BC	Bellum Octavianum.
80	Lost	87–86 BC	Citizenship given to Italian allies, Bellum Octavianum, death of Marius.
81	Lost	87–86 BC	First Mithridatic War, Sulla takes Athens.
82	Lost	86 BC	First Mithridatic War, battles of Chaeronea and Orchomenus, Valerius Flaccus is murdered by Flavius Fimbria.
83	Lost	86–84 BC	First Mithridatic War, Sulla's civil war.
84	Lost	84 BC	Sulla's civil war, death of Cinna.
85	Lost	83 BC	Sulla's civil war.
86	Lost	83–82 BC	Sulla's civil war, Second Mithridatic War.
87	Lost	82 BC	Sulla's civil war.
88	Lost	82 BC	Sulla's civil war, Battle of the Colline Gate, death of Marius the Younger.
89	Lost	82–81 BC	Sulla's civil war, death of Carbo, Sulla's proscription and reforms, Pompey's first triumph.
90	Lost	78 BC	Death of Sulla, uprising of Marcus Aemilius Lepidus, Sertorian War.
91	Fragment	77 BC	Sertorian War.
92	Lost	76 BC	Sertorian War, campaign of Gaius Scribonius Curio against the Dardanians.
93	Lost	76–75 BC	Publius Servilius conquers Isauria, Third Mithridatic War, Sertorian War.
94	Lost	74 BC	Third Mithridatic War, Sertorian War.
95	Lost	74–73 BC	War of Gaius Scribonius Curio against the Dardanians, Third Servile War, Third Mithridatic War.
96	Lost	73–72 BC	Third Servile War, Sertorian War.
97	Lost	71–70 BC	Third Servile War, campaign of Marcus Antonius Creticus in Crete, Third Mithridatic War, Crassus and Pompey become consuls.
98	Lost	70–69 BC	Third Mithridatic War, campaign of Quintus Caecillius Metellus in Crete.
99	Lost	68–67 BC	Third Mithridatic War, Pompey's expedition against the Cilician pirates, campaign of Quintus Caecillius Metellus in Crete.
100	Lost	66 BC	Third Mithridatic War, wars in Armenia.
101	Lost	66–65 BC	Third Mithridatic War, Catilinarian conspiracy.
102	Lost	64–63 BC	Third Mithridatic War, death of Mithridates, Pompey takes Jerusalem, Catilinarian conspiracy.
103	Lost	62–58 BC	Catilinarian conspiracy, Publius Clodius Pulcher goes over to the plebeians, First Triumvirate, Gallic Wars.
104	Lost	58–56 BC	Gallic Wars, Cicero returns from exile.
105	Lost	56–54 BC	Cato's attempt to obstruct the Triumvirate, Gallic Wars, first Crossing of the Rhine.
106	Lost	54–53 BC	Gallic Wars, Battle of Carrhae, death of Crassus.
107	Lost	53–52 BC	Gallic Wars, murder of Clodius by Milo, Pompey elected sole consul, revolt of Vercingetorix.
108	Lost	52–50 BC	Gallic Wars, Battle of Alesia, victory of Gaius Cassius Longinus against the Parthians.
109	Lost	50–49 BC	Caesar's Civil War, Crossing of the Rubicon.
110	Lost	49–48 BC	Caesar's Civil War.
111	Quote	48 BC	Caesar's Civil War (Battle of Pharsalus).
112	Quote (Note: Seneca the Younger, De Tranquillitate Animi 9.5.)	48 BC	Caesar's Civil War.
113	Lost	47 BC	Caesar's Civil War.
114	Lost	46 BC	Caesar's Civil War.
115	Lost	46 BC	Caesar's Civil War.
116	Lost	45–44 BC	Caesar's Civil War, assassination of Caesar.
117	Lost	44 BC	Octavian arrives in Italy, Antony disrupts the allotment of provinces, preparations for war on multiple sides.
118	Lost	44 BC	Brutus takes the army of Publius Vatinius in Greece, Octavian builds an army, Antony besieges Modena.
119	Lost	44–43 BC	Publius Cornelius Dolabella is declared enemy of the state, Battle of Mutina, Octavian becomes consul at 19.
120	Quote (Note: Seneca the Elder, Suasoriae 6.17.)	43 BC	Second Triumvirate, proscriptions, death of Cicero.
121	Lost	43 BC	Cassius besieges Dolabella in Laodicea, who commits suicide; Brutus executes Gaius Antonius.
122	Lost	43 BC	Brutus' campaign in Thrace.
123	Lost	42 BC	Sicilian revolt by Sextus Pompey, Liberators' Civil War.
124	Lost	42 BC	Battle of Philippi.
125	Lost	41 BC	Perusine War.
126	Lost	41–40 BC	Perusine War.
127	Lost	40–39 BC	Pompeian–Parthian invasion, Pact of Misenum.
128	Lost	38–37 BC	Sicilian revolt, Antony's Parthian War, Siege of Jerusalem.
129	Lost	36 BC	Sicilian Revolt, Battle of Naulochus, Octavian defeats Lepidus.
130	Lost	36 BC	Antony's Parthian War.
131	Lost	35–34 BC	Sextus Pompey is captured and executed by Antony, Octavian's campaigns in Illyria, Antony's conquest of Armenia, Donations of Alexandria.
132	Lost	34–31 BC	Antony's Civil War: Battle of Actium.
133	Lost	30–28 BC	Antony's Civil War: suicides of Antony and Cleopatra; conspiracy of Marcus Aemilius Lepidus Minor.
134	Lost	27 BC	Octavian becomes Augustus, census in the three Gauls, campaign of Marcus Licinius Crassus against the Basterni and Moesians.
135	Lost	25 BC	Campaigns of Marcus Crassus against the Thracians, and of Augustus in Hispania.
136	Lost		Missing in the Periochae.
137	Lost		Missing in the Periochae.
138	Lost	15–12 BC	Tiberius and Drusus conquers Raetia, death of Agrippa, Drusus makes a census in Gaul.
139	Lost	12 BC	Drusus' campaign in Germania, Imperial cult at Lugdunum.
140	Lost	11 BC	Conquest of Thracia, Drusus' campaign in Germania, death of Octavia.
141	Lost	10 BC	Drusus' campaign in Germania.
142	Lost	9 BC	Death of Drusus.

== Style ==
Livy wrote in a mixture of annual chronology and narrative. This emerged from his decision to organise his narrative on a year-by-year scheme with regular announcements of elections of "consuls, prodigies, temple dedications, triumphs, and the like". This kind of year-by-year list of events is termed "annalistic history". Livy employed annalistic features to associate his history with the dominant traditional of Roman history, which was to write these annalistic chronicles; in so doing, he "imbued his history with an aura of continuity and stability" along with "pontifical authority".

The first and third decades (see below) of Livy's work are written so well that Livy has become a sine qua non of curricula in Golden Age Latin. Some have argued that subsequently the quality of his writing began to decline, and that he becomes repetitious and wordy. Of the 91st book Barthold Georg Niebuhr says "repetitions are here so frequent in the small compass of four pages and the prolixity so great, that we should hardly believe it to belong to Livy...." Niebuhr accounts for the decline by supposing "the writer has grown old and become loquacious...", going so far as to conjecture that the later books were lost because copyists refused to copy such low-quality work.

However, Livy also employed repetitive and formulaic wording in description of repetitive military affairs, described by Ogilvie as "mechanical and careless". Modern readers, however, view Livy's repetitive prose more positively at least in performance of prayers, blessings, and public religious rituals.

A digression in Book 9, Sections 17–19, suggests that the Romans would have beaten Alexander the Great if he had lived longer and had turned west to attack the Romans, making this digression one of the oldest known written alternate history scenarios.

== Publication ==
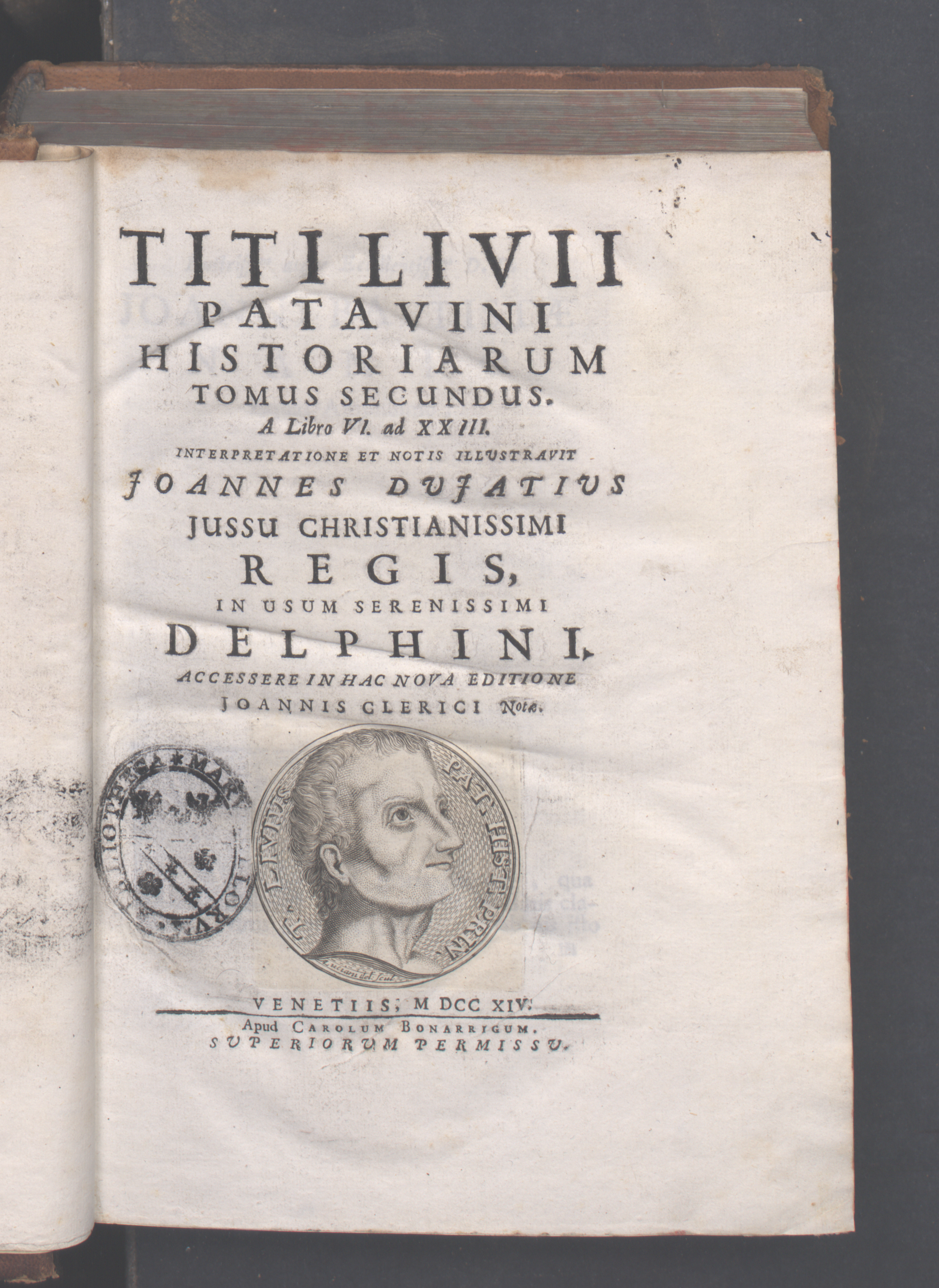
Ab Urbe condita, 1714

The first five books were published between 27 and 25 BC. The first date mentioned is the year Augustus received that eponymous title: twice in the first five books Livy uses it. For the second date, Livy lists the closings of the temple of Janus but omits that of 25 (it had not happened yet).

Livy continued to work on the History for much of the rest of his life, publishing new material by popular demand. This explains why the work falls naturally into 12 packets, mainly groups of 10 books, or decades, sometimes of 5 books (pentads or pentades) and the rest without any packet order. The scheme of dividing it entirely into decades is a later innovation of copyists.

The second pentad did not come out until 9 or after, some 16 years after the first pentad. In Book IX Livy states that the Cimminian Forest was more impassable than the German had been recently, referring to the Hercynian Forest (Black Forest) first opened by Drusus and Ahenobarbus.

== Manuscripts ==
There is no uniform system of classifying and naming manuscripts. Often the relationship of one manuscript (MS) to another remains unknown or changes as perceptions of the handwriting change. Livy's release of chapters by packet diachronically encouraged copyists to copy by decade. Each decade has its own conventions, which do not necessarily respect the conventions of any other decade. A family of MSS descend through copying from the same MSS (typically lost). MSS vary widely; to produce an emendation or a printed edition was and is a major task. Usually variant readings are given in footnotes.

=== First decade ===
All of the manuscripts (except one) of the first ten books (first decade) of Ab urbe condita, which were copied through the Middle Ages and were used in the first printed editions, are derived from a single recension commissioned by Quintus Aurelius Symmachus, consul, AD 391. A recension is made by comparing extant manuscripts and producing a new version, an emendation, based on the text that seems best to the editor. The latter then "subscribed" to the new MS by noting on it that he had emended it.

Symmachus, probably using the authority of his office, commissioned Tascius Victorianus to emend the first decade. Books I–IX bear the subscription Victorianus emendabam dominis Symmachis, "I Victorianus emended (this) by the authority of Symmachus." Books VI–VIII include another subscription preceding it, that of Symmachus' son-in-law, Nicomachus Flavianus, and Books III–V were also emended by Flavianus' son, Appius Nicomachus Dexter, who says he used his relative Clementianus' copy. This recension and family of descendant MSS is called the Nicomachean, after two of the subscribers. From it several MSS descend (incomplete list):

Nicomachean Family of MSS
Identifying Letter	Location & Number	Name	Date
V		Veronensis rescriptus	10th century
H		Harleianus	10th century
E		Einsiedlensis	10th century
F	Paris 5724	Floriacensis	10th century
P	Paris 5725	Parisiensis	9th/10th century
M		Mediceus-Laurentianus	10th/11th century
U		Upsaliensis	10th/11th century
R	Vaticanus 3329	Romanus	11th century
O	Bodleianus 20631	Oxoniensis	11th century
D	Florentinus-Marcianus	Dominicanus	12th century
A		Agennensis; Petrarch's copy	12th–14th century

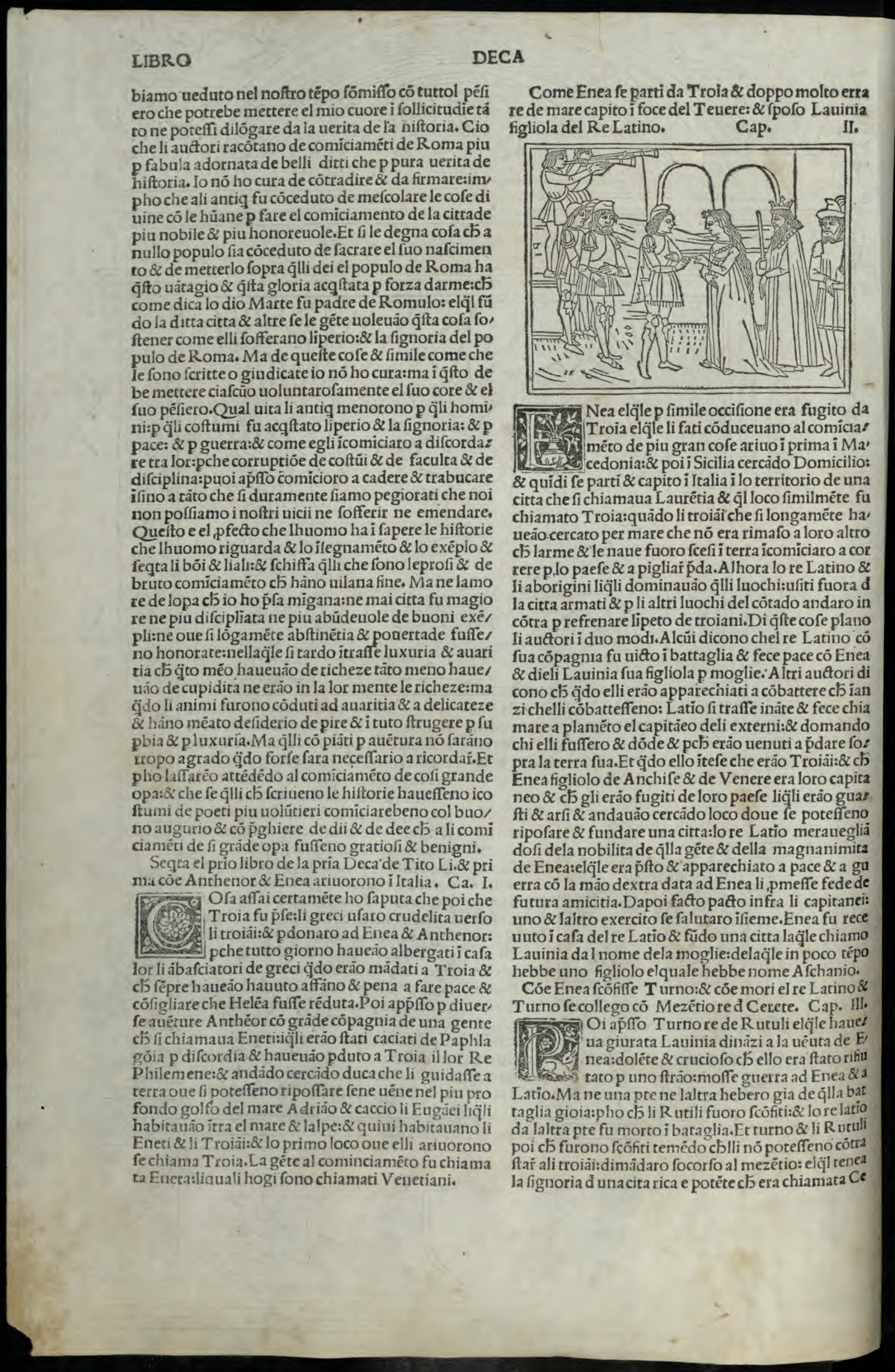
Ab urbe condita, 1493

Epigraphists go on to identify several hands and lines of descent. A second family of the first decade consists of the Verona Palimpsest, reconstructed and published by Theodore Mommsen, 1868; hence the Veronensis MSS. It includes 60 leaves of Livy fragments covering Books III-VI. The handwriting style is dated to the 4th century, only a few centuries after Livy.

During the Middle Ages, there were constant rumours that the complete books of the History of Livy lay hidden in the library of a Danish or German Monastery. One individual even affirmed under oath in the court of Martin V that he had seen the whole work, written in Lombardic script, in a monastery in Denmark. All of these rumours were later found to be unsubstantiated.

== Veracity ==
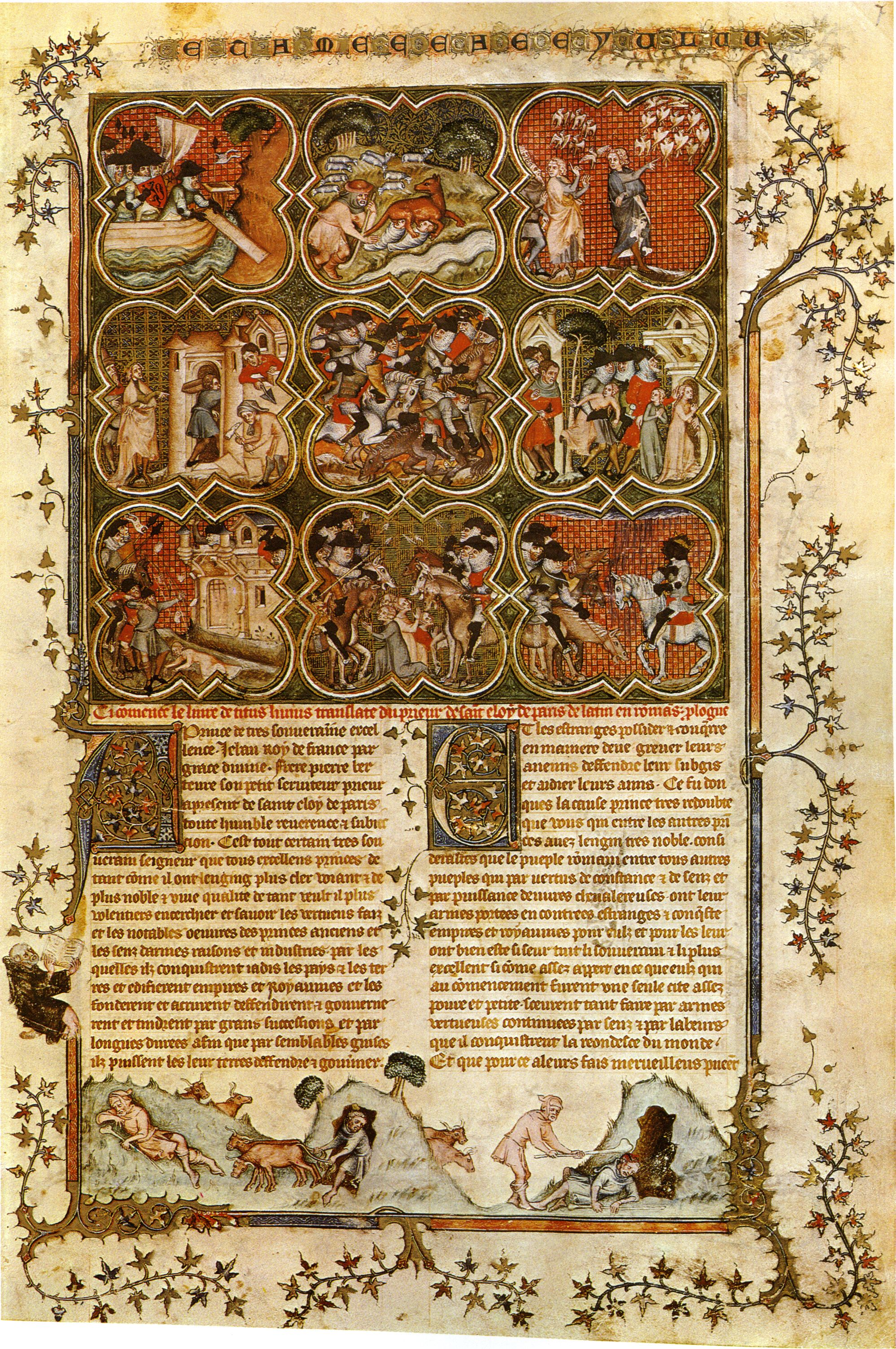
An illumination in a manuscript of Ab urbe condita, in the French translation of Pierre Bersuire. The manuscript belonged to king Charles V of France. The illumination shows mythical scenes concerning the foundation of Rome and previous mythical history. Paris, Bibliothèque Sainte-Geneviève, Ms. 777, fol. 7r.

The orthodox view is that "Livy was a very poor historian indeed, whether by ancient or modern standards". This is rooted in a few major reasons. He did "no primary research", relying "exclusively on earlier histories". His understanding of those sources was poor: with Livy relating the same event twice on multiple occasions. Moreover, "there are clear signs that his Greek was not good enough to understand properly one of his major sources, the Greek historian Polybius", whom he followed closely for events in the east in books 31 to 45.

Livy also did not intend to produce a history in terms of cataloguing and understanding the past, but rather, in terms of preserving a "memory ... [that] equips the reader with a sense of wrong and right as determined or exemplified by the actions of one's predecessors". Moreover, the work was also written "under the shadow of the new emperor" with the goal of supporting "the idea that the Augustan principate was the culmination of Roman history".

While other sources have attempted to rehabilitate Livy's history in terms of its literary quality (for example, DS Levene's Livy on the Hannibalic War), this is not a defence of the history's historicity. Modern criticism of Livy also goes into the "inaccuracy of his battle accounts, the vagueness of his geography, ... the excessive partiality shown to one or [an]other of his 'heroes', and in general the highly rhetorical nature of not only his speeches but also of his dramatic narrations".

However, judgement on Livy's whole work ought to be withheld insofar as only the first third of Ab urbe condita survives; the portions of Livy that survive, heavily relying on an uncritical repetition of earlier sources, may not be the same approach he took for later periods of the republic or his own time, where he would have needed "to do his own research using contemporary testimonies from eyewitnesses[,] the records of the senate and the assemblies[, and records of the] speeches of the great orators".

=== Historicity ===
The details of Livy's History vary from the legendary and mythical stories at the beginning to detailed accounts of real events toward the end. Livy, in his preface on discussing the early history of Rome, noted the difficulties of interpreting or reconciling the sources in his own day:

So many chronological errors, magistrates appearing differently in different authors, suggest ... you cannot tell which consuls came after which or what belonged [to] any one year...

It is not easy to prefer one thing over the other or one author over another. I think that the tradition has been contaminated... since various families have fraudulently arrogated to themselves the repute of deeds and offices. As a result, both individuals' deeds and the public records of events have certainly been thrown into confusion. Nor is there any writer contemporary with those times who could serve as a reliable standard.

Livy too recognised that the early years of Rome were profoundly ahistorical, saying "the traditions of what happened prior to the foundation of the city or whilst it was being built, are more fitted to adorn the creations of the poet than the authentic records of the historian". The first book has been one of the most significant sources of the various accounts of the traditional legend of Romulus and Remus. However, when comparing Livy's account of the kingdom to that of Dionysius of Halicarnassus, his scepticism is better evident, as he omitted "many stories which seemed rather improbable to him". And in general, the early parts of the books are important accounts of early Rome surviving from antiquity.

But while Livy did recognise "the higher reliability of older contemporary authors compared to younger ones", he did little to ensure that his history was internally consistent or follow his own insights on unreliability regularly, preferring the story of his chosen choice without changes, "even if he afterward detected capital errors".

Livy's treatment of his own sources was more in terms of arranging material and synthesising a narrative rather than engaging in original research into official documents; in doing so, he "did little more than [trying] to reconcile discrepancies in his sources by using arguments from probability". However, Livy did not substantially grapple with the possibility that annalists knew how to invent probable stories. Furthermore, rarely did Livy provide the names of his sources, especially in the long passages where he followed one major source with infrequent comparisons to other sources to correct errors. Fortunately, Livy's goal in telling existing narratives with "better style and arrangement" means he seemingly did not introduce into his history "invented episodes of exaggerations".

=== Livy's sources ===
Livy's work "came at the end of a long line of historians ... conventionally known as the 'annalistic tradition'". Where he relied on these sources (along with other narrative sources available in his day) his principle was similar to that of Herodotus': "tell what he had been told".

Roman historiography goes back to Quintus Fabius Pictor who wrote c. 200 BC, heavily influenced by Greek historiographical canons and methods. Other annalists included Quintus Ennius, Marcus Porcius Cato the censor, Lucius Calpurnius Piso Frugi, Lucius Cassius Hemina, Gnaeus Gellius, Vennonius, Valerius Antias, Licinius Macer, Quintus Claudius Quadrigarius, and Quintus Aelius Tubero. The last three annalists (operating in the first century BC) are, however, "widely believed to have been less scrupulous than their second-century predecessors", supplying stories about the archaic period "from their own imaginations". However, as to certain elements of his narrative, Livy may have relied on "unscrupulous annalists" who "did not hesitate to invent a series of face-saving victories".

Livy did not use the libri lintei or the annales maximi kept by the pontifex maximus; nor did he "walk around in Rome, or elsewhere, to discover inscriptions or other new documents". The difficulties of using the senate's own archives, documented in speeches by Cicero, "hint... at the possibilities of falsifying evidence" and the poor transmission of authoritative historical records.

== Later influences ==
=== Machiavelli ===
Niccolò Machiavelli's work on republics, Discourses on Livy, is presented as a commentary on the History of Rome.

=== Translations ===
The first complete rendering of Ab urbe condita into English was Philemon Holland's translation published in 1600. According to Considine, "it was a work of great importance, presented in a grand folio volume of 1,458 pages, and dedicated to [Queen Elizabeth I]".

A notable translation of Livy titled History of Rome was made by B.O. Foster in 1919 for the Loeb Classical Library. A partial translation by Aubrey de Sélincourt was printed in 1960–1965 for Penguin Classics.

The version of Livy available on Wikisource is that from the 1905 translation of Reverend Canon Roberts for Everyman's Library.
