= Quintus Aurelius Symmachus (consul 446) =

5th-century Roman senator

Quintus Aurelius Symmachus (floruit 446) was an aristocrat of the Western Roman Empire. He was appointed consul by the western court, together with general Flavius Aetius, in 446.

== Biography ==
Aurelius Symmachus was a member of the Symmachi family. He was probably the son of Quintus Fabius Memmius Symmachus (and therefore grandson of the orator Quintus Aurelius Symmachus), and he was likely the father of Quintus Aurelius Memmius Symmachus. He may also be the Symmachus to whom Macrobius dedicated the work De differentiis vel societatibus graeci latinique verbi.

== Bibliography ==
- Martindale, John R., ed. (1980). "Q. Aurelius Symmachus 9". The Prosopography of the Later Roman Empire: Volume II, AD 395–527. Cambridge: Cambridge University Press. p. 1046. ISBN 0-521-20159-4.

Political offices
Preceded by Imp. Caesar Flavius Placidus Valentinianus Augustus VI, Flavius Nomus	Consul of the Roman Empire; 446 with Flavius Aetius III	Succeeded by Flavius Calepius, Flavius Ardaburius Iunior
