= Eugenius =

Western Roman emperor from 392 to 394

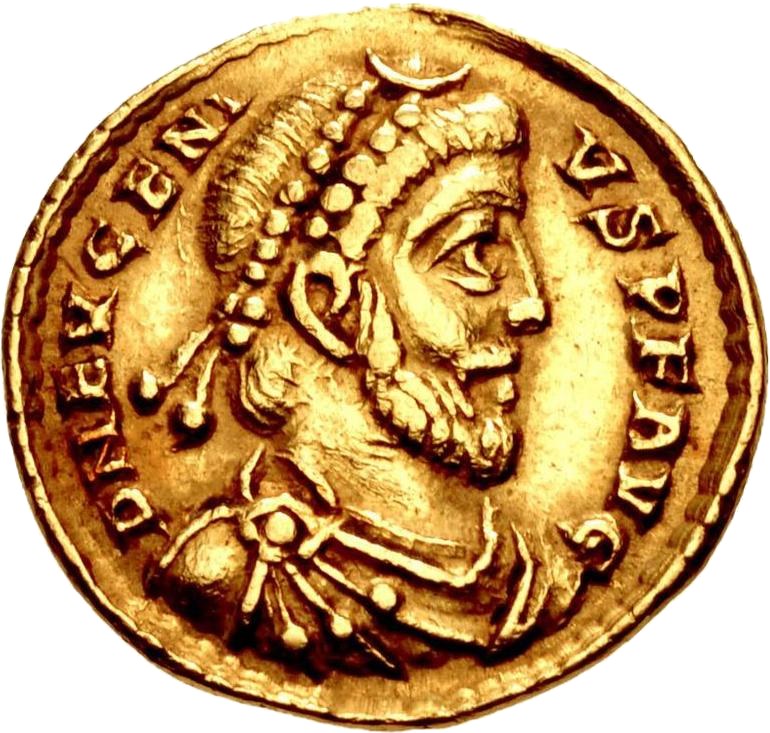
- Tremissis depicting Eugenius, marked: d·n· eugenius p·f· aug·

Roman emperor in the West
- Reign: 22 August 392 – 6 September 394
- Predecessor: Valentinian II
- Successor: Theodosius I
- Died: 6 September 394; Frigidus River
- Religion: Nicene Christianity

Eugenius (died 6 September 394) was a Western Roman emperor from 392 to 394, unrecognized by the Eastern Roman emperor Theodosius I. While Christian himself, Eugenius capitalized on the discontent in the West caused by Theodosius' religious policies targeting pagans. He renovated the pagan Temple of Venus and Roma and restored the Altar of Victory after continued petitions from the Roman Senate. Eugenius replaced Theodosius' administrators with men loyal to him. This included pagans, reviving the pagan cause. His army fought the army of Theodosius at the Battle of the Frigidus, where he was captured and executed.

== Life ==
A Christian and former teacher of grammar and rhetoric, as well as magister scriniorum, Eugenius had become an acquaintance of Arbogast, the magister militum, after being introduced to him by Arbogast's uncle Richomeres. Arbogast was of Frankish origin and de facto ruler of the western portion of the Empire.

=== Rise to power ===
Three months after the death of Valentinian II, Eugenius was elevated to augustus on 22 August 392 at Lyons, by Arbogast. Deferring to Eugenius offered Arbogast two strong advantages: first, Eugenius, a Roman and Christian, was more suitable than Arbogast, a Frank and pagan, as an Augustus; furthermore, the Roman Senate would be more likely to support Eugenius.

=== Civil, religious, and military policies ===
After being installed as Emperor, Eugenius changed the imperial administrators. When Theodosius had left the western half of the empire to Valentinian II, he had put his own men in the highest civil offices, to keep a strong grasp on the whole empire. Eugenius replaced these administrators with others loyal to himself, coming from the senatorial class. Virius Nicomachus Flavianus the Elder became praetorian prefect, his son Nicomachus Flavianus the Younger received the title of praefectus urbi, while the new praefectus annonae was Numerius Proiectus.

Though his actual beliefs are a matter of controversy among ancient and modern historians, Eugenius was at least publicly a Christian. Pagan senators convinced Eugenius to use public money to fund pagan projects, such as the rededication of the Temple of Venus and Roma and the restoration of the Altar of Victory within the Curia. Eugenius' appointment of Nicomachus Flavianus, a pagan, as Praetorian Prefect of Italy, revived the pagan cause. These religious policies created tension with pro-Christian figures, such as Emperor Theodosius and the powerful and influential Bishop Ambrose, who left his see in Milan when the imperial court of Eugenius arrived.

Eugenius was also successful in the military field, notably in the renovation of old alliances with Alamanni and Franks, even marching to the Rhine frontier, where he impressed and pacified the Germanic tribes by parading his army in front of them. After this display, he recruited Alamannic and Frankish units for his army.

=== Fall ===
After his election as emperor, Eugenius sent two embassies to Theodosius's court, asking for recognition of his election. Theodosius received them, but both embassies were given vague responses and returned without completing their missions. In January 393, Theodosius promoted his eight-year-old son Honorius to the rank of Augustus of the West, indicating he considered Eugenius' elevation illegitimate.

Following the news of Honorius' elevation to Augustus, Eugenius and Arbogast marched their army, stripped from the Rhine frontier, into Italy in the spring of 393. Theodosius then moved from Constantinople with his army, and met Eugenius and Arbogast at the Battle of the Frigidus in the Vipava Valley, on 6 September 394. The bloody battle lasted two days, and was marked by unusually strong winds, and ended with a victory for Theodosius' forces. Eugenius was captured and executed, and his head was displayed in Theodosius' camp. Arbogast committed suicide the next day.

== Sources ==
- Errington, R. Malcolm (2006). Roman Imperial Policy from Julian to Theodosius. Chapel Hill: University of North Carolina Press. ISBN 0-8078-3038-0.
- Heather, Peter J. (2012). Empires and Barbarians: The Fall of Rome and the Birth of Europe. Oxford University Press.
- Hebblewhite, Mark (2020). Theodosius and the Limits of Empire. London: Routledge. doi:10.4324/9781315103334. ISBN 978-1-138-10298-9. S2CID 213344890.
- Jones, A.H.M.; J.R. Martindale & J. Morris (1971). Prosopography of the Later Roman Empire. Vol. 1. Cambridge University Press. ISBN 0-521-07233-6.
- Potter, David S. (2004). The Roman Empire at Bay: AD 180–395. New York: Routledge. ISBN 0-415-10057-7.
- Roberts, Walter E. (1998). "Flavius Eugenius (392–394)". De Imperatoribus Romanis.
- Williams, Stephen; Friell, Gerard (1994). Theodosius: The Empire at Bay. Yale University Press. ISBN 978-0-300-07447-5.

Regnal titles
Preceded by Valentinian II	Roman emperor 392–394	Succeeded by Theodosius I
Political offices
Preceded by Arcadius Augustus; Rufinus	Roman consul 393	Succeeded by Virius Nicomachus Flavianus
