= Hilarius (praefectus urbi) =

Politician of the Western Roman Empire

Hilarius (floruit 408) was a politician of the Western Roman Empire.

Hilarius is known to be the praefectus urbi of Rome in 408. He is attested in office on January 15 of that year by a law preserved in the Codex Theodosianus. He has been sometimes identified with a Hilarius Praetorian prefect of Gaul in 396, but this identification is rejected by historians on the fact that the urban prefecture was a lesser office than the praetorian one.

== Bibliography ==
- Martindale, John R., ed. (1980). "Hilarius 2". The Prosopography of the Later Roman Empire: Volume II, AD 395–527. Cambridge: Cambridge University Press. p. 563. ISBN 0-521-20159-4.

Preceded by Senator	Praefectus urbi of Rome; 408	Succeeded by Nicomachus Flavianus
