= Virius Nicomachus Flavianus =

Roman grammarian and politician

Virius Nicomachus Flavianus (334–394 AD) was a grammarian, a historian and a politician of the Roman Empire.

A pagan and close friend of Quintus Aurelius Symmachus, he was Praetorian prefect of Italy from 390–392. Under the usurper Eugenius (392–394), Flavianus was once again praetorian prefect (393–394) and consul (394, recognized only within Eugenius' territory). After the death of Eugenius at the battle of the Frigidus, Flavianus killed himself.

== Biography ==
Nicomachus Flavianus was born in 334, and belonged to the Nicomachi, an influential family of senatorial rank. His father was Volusius Venustus, and from his wife, a pagan herself, he had a son also called Nicomachus Flavianus and maybe another son called Venustus; he was also grandfather of Appius Nicomachus Dexter and of Galla.

His career can be reconstructed from two inscriptions: one (CIL, VI, 1782) put up by his granddaughter's husband Quintus Fabius Memmius Symmachus and probably inscribed in 394, the other (CIL, VI, 1783) coming from the basis of a statue erected in 431 in Trajan's Forum by his nephew Appius Nicomachus Dexter, to celebrate his grandfather's memory after its restoration by the ruling emperors. Flavianus' cursus honorum included the following offices:

- quaestor,
- praetor,
- pontifex maior,
- consular of Sicilia (364/365),
- vicarius of Africa (376/377),
- quaestor sacri palatii,
- praetorian prefect of Illyricum and Italia (390–392),
- praetorian prefect of Illyricum and Italia for the second time (393–394),
- consul without a colleague (394).

During his office as vicarius Africae he received a law against Donatism; however it seems he somehow sided with the Donatists, if in 405 Augustine of Hippo misbelieved him a Donatist. In this office he, together with Decimius Hilarianus Hesperius, was in charge of the investigations around a scandal involving the city of Leptis Magna, but his conclusions, included in a report, had the citizens cleared of the charges; afterwards the citizens of Leptis Magna erected him a statue.

In 392 Flavianus had been praetorian prefect of Illyricum and Africa for two years, when the emperor of the western part of the Roman Empire, Valentinian II, died, either killed or committing suicide (15 May); his general Arbogast, with whom he had had a long conflict, was suspected of being involved in his death. As soon as he heard of Valentinian's death, eastern emperor Theodosius I nominated another praetorian prefect for Illyricum, Apodemius, who received also the praetorian prefecture of Africa in late 392/early 393. Arbogast, foreseeing an attack from Theodosius, put up a usurper, Eugenius, as emperor of the western part. As soon as Eugenius entered Italy (his crowning had been in Lyon on 22 August 393), Flavianus went to him and was appointed praetorian prefect for the second time; his key role within Eugenius' administration was confirmed with Flavianus' election to the consulate of 394 without a colleague (this office was recognized only within Eugenius' territory).

There is another important aspect of Flavianus' activity under Eugenius, the one often referred to as the "pagan revival". Eugenius was a Christian, but chose several pagans within the aristocracy as his allies. Flavianus took the opportunity and renewed the public ceremonies of the Roman religion, without the opposition of Eugenius, who was, for this reason, scolded by Ambrose, bishop of Milan. Theodosian propaganda first and Christian sources later presented the fight between Theodosius and Eugenius as a struggle of Christian faith against a last-standing Paganism: for this reason the religious acts of Flavianus have been interpreted as a pagan revival supported, or at least allowed, by Eugenius; a typical example is the episode of the Vita Ambrosii by Paulinus the Deacon, in which Flavianus and Arbogast, leaving Milan to clash into Theodosius' army, promise to destroy the city basilica and to enlist the Christian clergy into the army after their victorious return. Modern historians believe that there was not such a "pagan revival", but that Flavianus took the chance of a power vacuum (both in politics and in religion, as there was not, at the time, a powerful Christian figure) to support Roman religion, but without any plan by Eugenius.

Flavianus encouraged Eugenius in his struggle against Theodosius claiming that sacrifices had indicated victory in the forthcoming war. However, Eugenius and Arbogast were killed in the decisive battle of the Frigidus against the army of Theodosius (5 September 394); a few days later, Flavianus killed himself at the age of sixty.

== Pagan circle of Flavianus ==
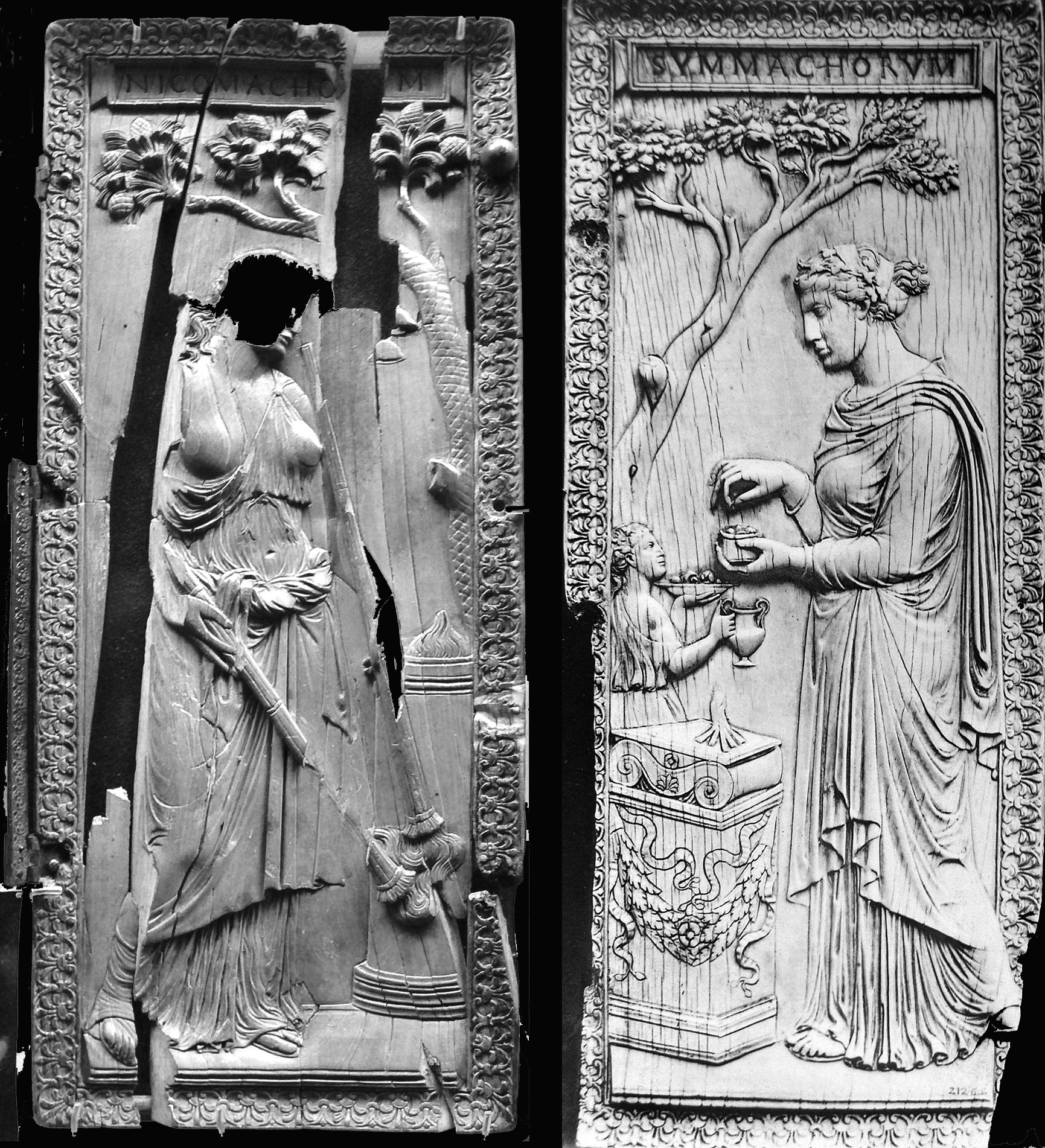
Symmachi–Nicomachi diptych; the left leaf is at the Musée National du Moyen Âge, Paris, the right leaf is at the Victoria and Albert Museum in London.

Flavianus belonged to the pagan circle which included also Vettius Agorius Praetextatus and Quintus Aurelius Symmachus. This circle was at the centre of the pagan movement of the late 4th century and, in particular through the work of the Nicomachi and Symmachi families, has been credited with preserving into modern times the works of several pagan authors, such as Livy, Martial and Apuleius.

The relationship between the Nicomachi and the Symmachi was strengthened through weddings: in 393/394 the son of Flavianus, Nicomachus Flavianus, married Galla, the daughter of Quintus Aurelius Symmachus, whose son, Quintus Fabius Memmius Symmachus, married in 401 a daughter or a nephew of Flavianus. The bond between the two families was celebrated, either in occasion of one of the two weddings or at the time of a joint endorsement of religious offices, with the issue of a diptych, the valves of which are entitled Nicomachorum and Symmachorum.

Praetextatus, Symmachus and Flavianus are the main characters of Macrobius Ambrosius Theodosius' Saturnalia, written in the 5th century but set in the summer holidays of 384; the author describes the leaders of the pagan movement who host in turn different pagan intellectuals to discuss philosophical and religious matters.

Flavianus also has a connection with Anicius Manlius Severinus Boethius via Quintus Aurelius Memmius Symmachus, adoptive father of Boethius. Symmachus named one of his daughters after the daughter of Flavianus. This is used to demonstrate the strong pagan influence on the household to which Boethius owed his loyalty.

== Flavianus' role in literature ==
In the inscription on the base of the statue he dedicated to his father-in-law, Quintus Fabius Memmius Symmachus calls Flavianus historicus disertissimus. In fact, Flavianus wrote a history of Rome entitled Annales ("Annals"), now lost; it was dedicated to Theodosius (probably when Flavianus was quaestor sacri palatii in the 380s) and written in annalist form. As the title suggests, it might have been a continuation of the Annals by Tacitus: in fact, the often unreliable Historia Augusta, in the book devoted to the life of the Emperor Aurelian (270–275), includes a letter from Aurelian to Queen Zenobia that the author claims to have been reported by a Nicomachus; it is therefore possible that Nicomachus' work was a continuation of Tacitus' until at least Aurelian. Flavianus' Annals was maybe used by Ammianus Marcellinus as a source.

Flavianus translated also from the Greek Philostratus' Life of Apollonius of Tyana, about a man whose life was seen as very close to that of Jesus and whose biography therefore was considered akin to a pagan Gospel in the 4th century.

Flavianus has been identified with the object of the Christian work known as Carmen adversus Flavianum. He is one of the main characters, together with other members of his pagan club, of Macrobius' Saturnalia, a work written in the 430s, where he is depicted as a man of huge erudition. In his Ecclesiastical History, Tyrannius Rufinus depicts the pagan Flavianus, rather than the Christian Eugenius, as the true opponent defeated by the Christian Theodosius at the battle of the Frigidus; according to Rufinus, Flavianus killed himself because he realized his own religion was false. Scholars are unanimous in the belief that Rufinus invented this claim to advance the cause of the religion for which he so zealously apologised.

== Notes ==
Political offices
Preceded by Theodosius I Eugenius; Abundantius	Roman consul 394 with Arcadius and Honorius	Succeeded by Anicius Hermogenianus Olybrius; Anicius Probinus
