= Quintus Fabius Memmius Symmachus =

Politician of the Roman Empire

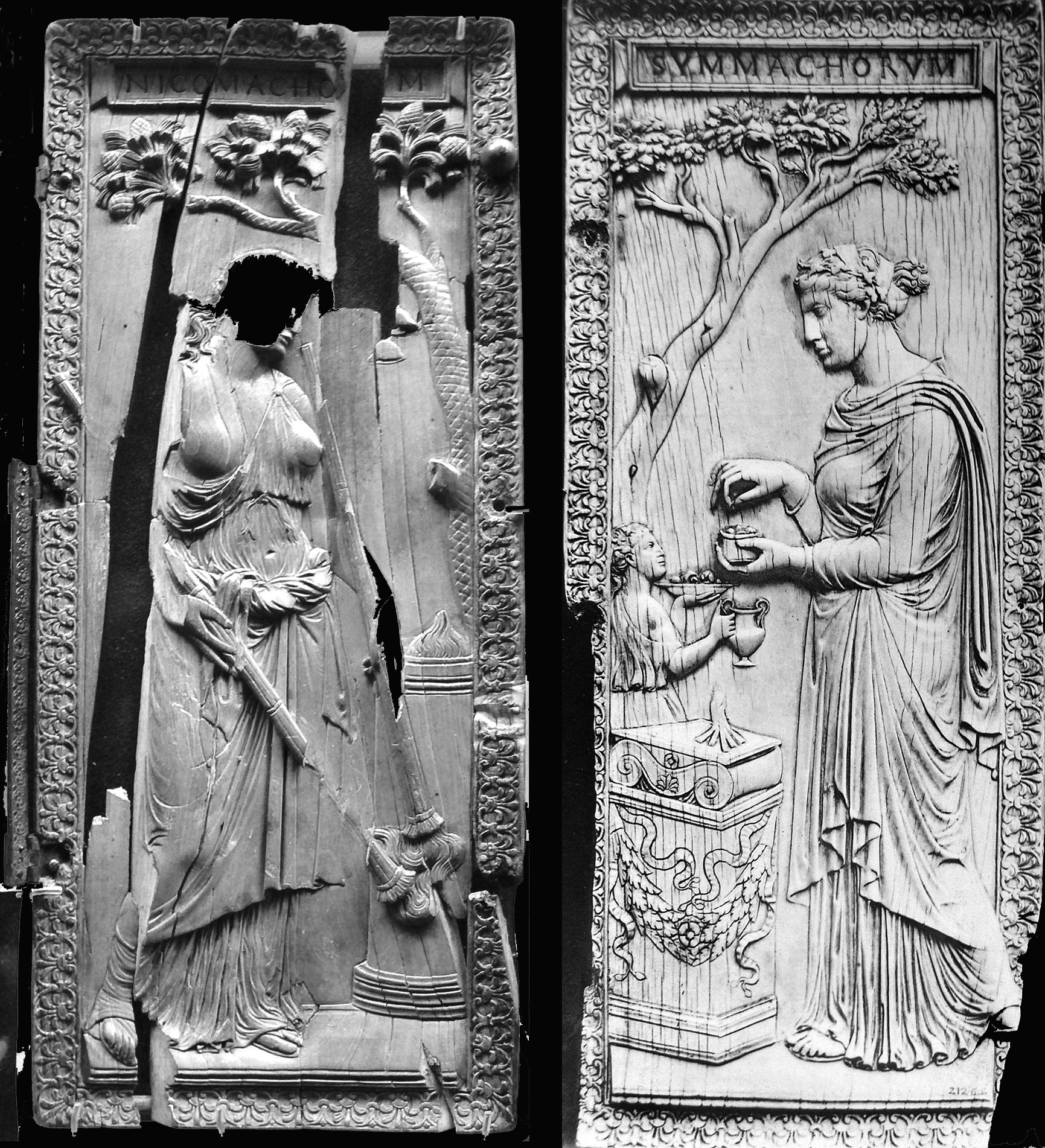
Symmachi–Nicomachi diptych; the left leaf is at the Musée National du Moyen Âge, Paris, the right leaf is at the Victoria and Albert Museum in London. It is possible that this diptych, honouring the bond between the two aristocratic and pagan families of the Symmachi and Nicomachi, was issued in occasion of Memmius' marriage with a woman of the Nicomachi in 401.

Quintus Fabius Memmius Symmachus (383/384 – after 402) was a politician of the Roman Empire, member of the influential family of the Symmachi.

== Biography ==
He was son of the orator and politician Quintus Aurelius Symmachus and of Rusticiana; he was born in 383/384. Memmius had an elder sister, Galla, who married Nicomachus Flavianus, son of Virius Nicomachus Flavianus.

At the age of ten, he became quaestor, celebrating the public games connected with his office in December 393. Memmius was well educated, and studied Greek language; his father approved his style in writing letters and, in 401, he studied with a Gallic rhetor as his tutor. The year 401 marked several important events in Memmius' life: he married the granddaughter of Virius Nicomachus Flavianus; he also celebrated the games connected with the second step in his cursus honorum, the office of praetor (these games were postponed from 400, in order to allow Aurelius Symmachus to be present, and cost 2000 pounds of gold).

It was probably Memmius who, belonging to a family practicing the old Roman religion, built a temple devoted to Flora in Rome; he is also the author of a dedicatory inscription in honour of his father-in-law Flavianus (CIL, VI, 1782). After his father's death ca. 402, Memmius edited part of his correspondence (which Symmachus himself had likely started to do).

== Bibliography ==
- Martindale, John R.; Jones, A. H. M.; Morris, John, eds. (1971). "Q. Fabius Memmius Symmachus 10". The Prosopography of the Later Roman Empire: Volume I, AD 260–395. Cambridge: Cambridge University Press. pp. 1046–1047. ISBN 0-521-07233-6.
