= Symmachi–Nicomachi diptych =

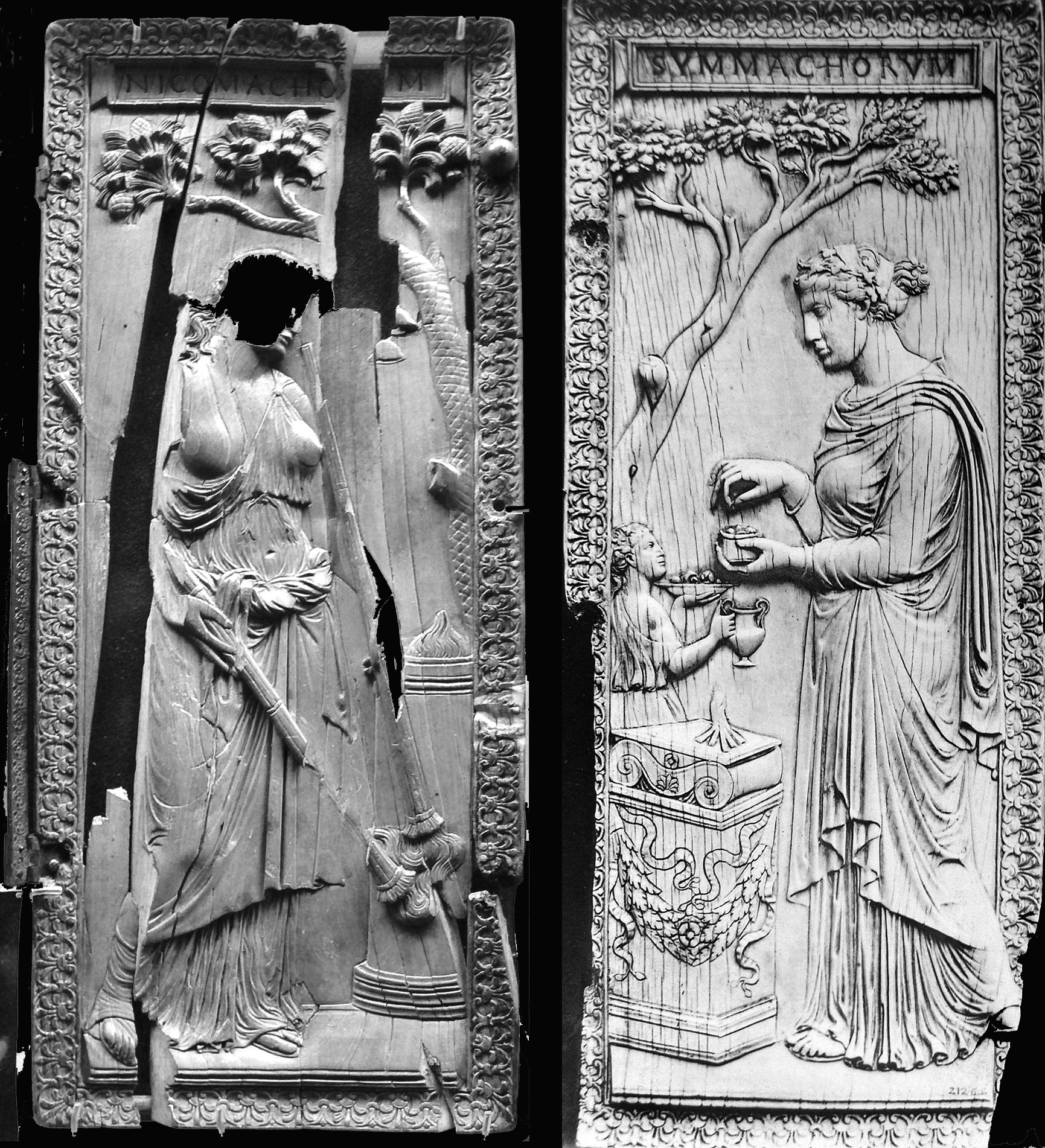
The two panels side by side, almost 30 cm high (1 ft)

The Symmachi–Nicomachi diptych is a book-size Late Antique ivory diptych dating to the late fourth or early fifth century, whose panels depict scenes of ritual pagan religious practices. Both its style and its content reflect a short-lived revival of traditional Roman religion and Classicism at a time when the Roman world was turning towards Christianity and rejecting the Classical tradition.

The diptych takes its name from the inscriptions Nicomachorum and Symmachorum, in reference to two prominent Roman Senatorial families, the Nichomachi and Symmachi.

== Provenance ==
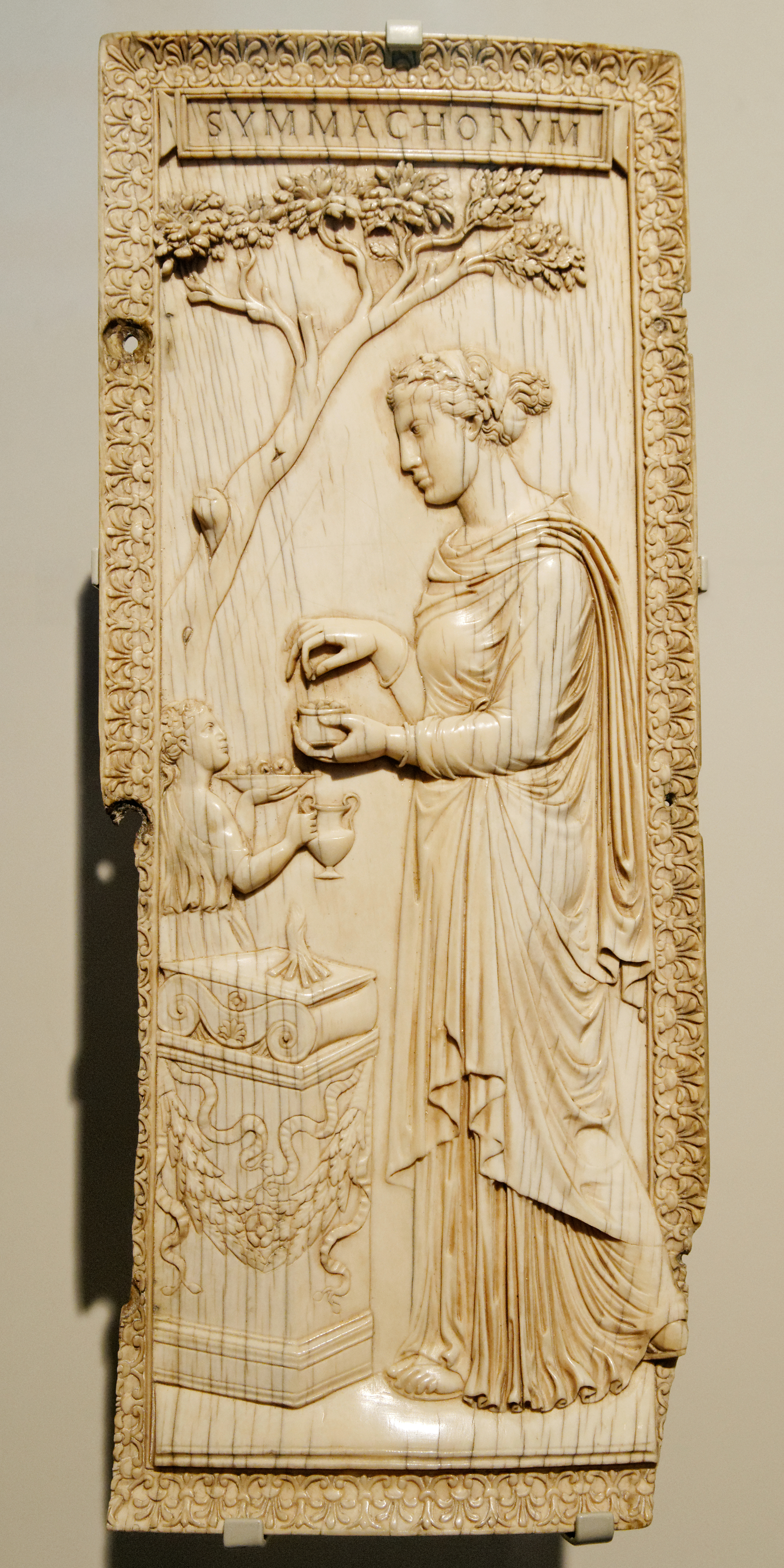
Symmachi leaf (in the Victoria and Albert Museum)

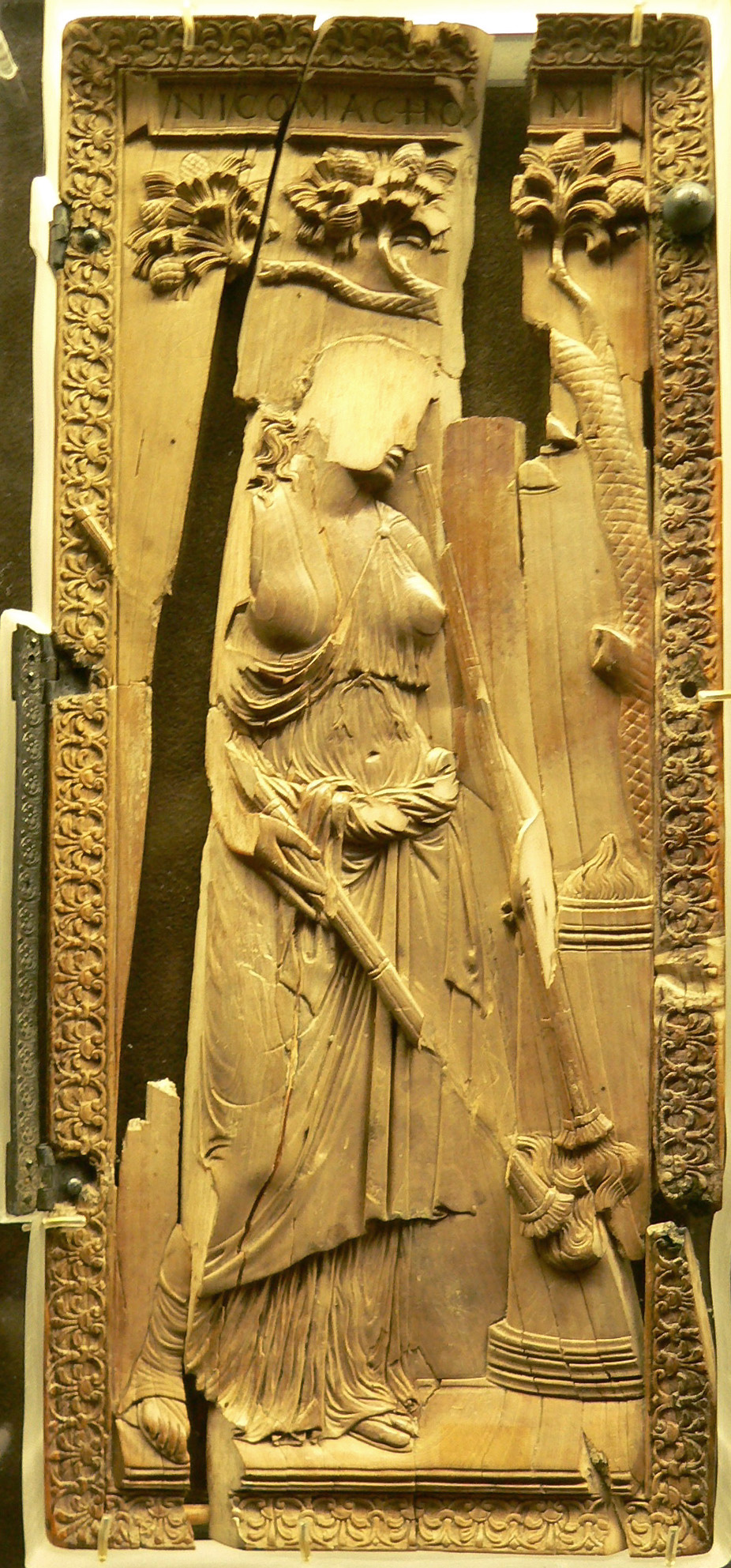
Nicomachi leaf (in the Musée de Cluny)

The diptych remained intact until the nineteenth century. The earliest description of the leaves dates to 1717, when an inventory of the monastery of Montier-en-Der records them as doors on an early thirteenth-century reliquary. Art historian Richard Delbrueck uncovered a mention of the panels in the abbot Adso's tenth-century biography of Bercharius, who founded the monastery c. 670. Adso wrote that his predecessor "visited Jerusalem and obtained very many sacred relics, and he brought back with him excellent tablets of ivory."

When the events of the French Revolution forced the closure of the monastery in 1790, the reliquary and its panels were temporarily lost. The Nicomachi wing was recovered in 1860 from a well, heavily damaged by fire, and the mostly intact Symmachi panel resurfaced in the hands of a collector not long after. They were subsequently acquired by the Musée de Cluny, Paris, and the Victoria and Albert Museum, London, respectively.

== Description ==
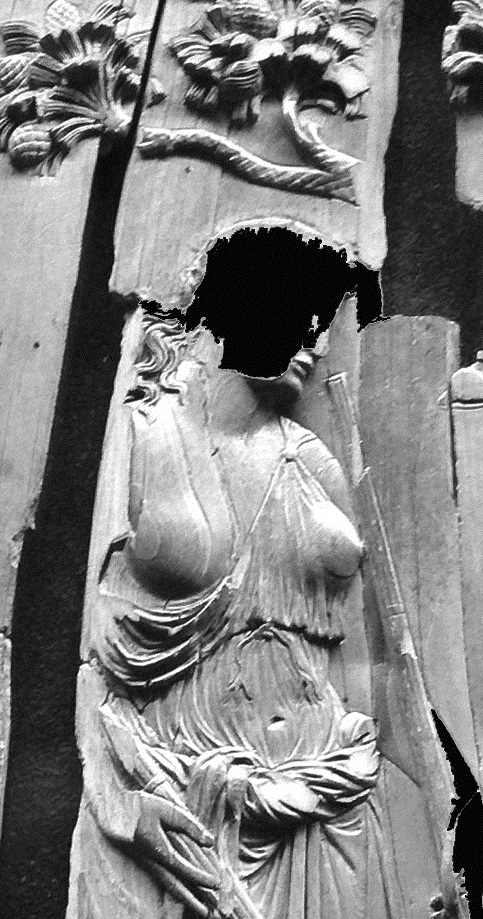
Detail, with lost surface

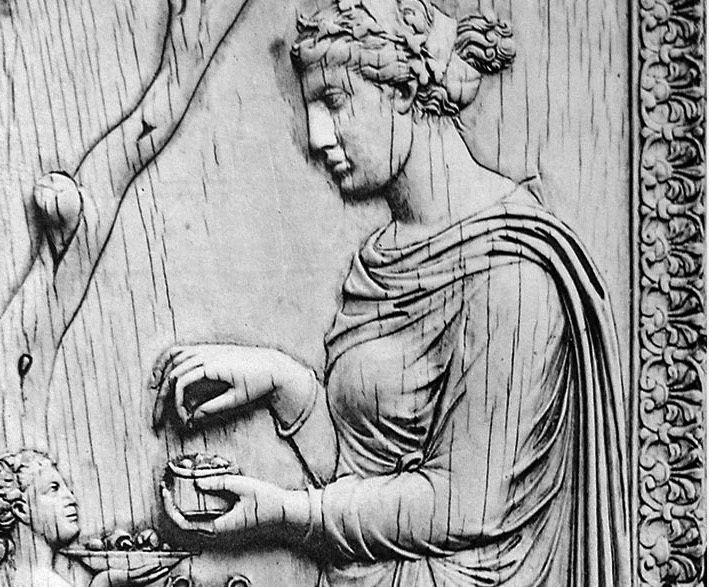
Detail

The diptych was produced in Rome sometime between 388 and 401. The Nicomachi panel measures 29.9 × 12.6 centimetres (11.8 × 5.0 in), that of the Symmachi is 29.8 × 12.2 cm (11.7 × 4.8 in). Both wings depict female figures engaged in religious ritual before sacrificial altars. The Nicomachi tablet in Paris is the less well preserved of the pair, having been damaged in a fire. The ivory is fractured in several places, with some sections missing completely, together with high-relief areas such as the female figure's face, left hand and right arm. This figure stands before a round altar, holding two lit torches now partially missing. Cymbals hang from a pine tree overhead; both the tree and its hangings are attributes of the goddess Cybele and her consort Attis.

The Symmachi leaf in the London diptych has an ivy-crowned woman sprinkling incense over the flames of a square altar, garlanded with oak wreaths. She is attended by a small figure holding a kantharos and a bowl of fruit. The oak garlands and overhead oak tree suggest the worship of Jupiter, while the ivy leaves recall the god Dionysus. The female figures have been variously interpreted as priestesses and as goddesses.

The panels are believed to celebrate the alliance through marriage of two senatorial families, the Symmachi and Nicomachi. The most likely candidates are the daughter of Senator Quintus Aurelius Symmachus and Nicomachus Flavianus, the son of his colleague Virius Nicomachus Flavianus, although it has also been suggested that the panels may instead commemorate the marriage of Symmachus' son, Q. Fabius Memmius Symmachus with the granddaughter of the aforementioned colleague. Diptychs were often commissioned by leading Roman families to celebrate important events, most often the attainment of the consulship. The diptych form, at least originally, served as a pair of covers for wax writing tablets.

The work as a whole has been interpreted as a study in nostalgia. Just as the majority of the Roman world had rejected polytheism in favor of Christianity, so too it left behind the techniques of proportion and perspective that characterised the art of its forebears.

== See also ==
- Consular diptych

== Bibliography ==
- Kinney, Dale (July 1994). "A Late Antique Ivory Plaque and Modern Response". American Journal of Archaeology. 98 (3): 457–472. doi:10.2307/506439. ISSN 1939-828X. JSTOR 506439. OCLC 51205117.
- Kitzinger, Ernst (1977). Byzantine Art in the Making: Main Lines of Stylistic Development in Mediterranean Art 3rd-7th Century. Cambridge, Massachusetts: Harvard University Press. ISBN 0674089561.
- Simon, Erika (April 1992). "The Diptych of the Symmachi and Nicomachi: An Interpretation". Greece & Rome. 39 (1): 56–65. doi:10.1017/S0017383500023986. ISSN 0017-3835. JSTOR 643120. OCLC 51206579.
- Weitzmann, Kurt (1979). Age of Spirituality: Late Antique and Early Christian Art, Third to Seventh Century. Catalogue of the exhibition at the Metropolitan Museum of Art, November 19, 1977, through February 12, 1978. New York: The Metropolitan Museum of Art. ISBN 0870991795.
