= Appius Nicomachus Dexter =

Western Roman politician

Appius Nicomachus Dexter (floruit before 432 AD) was a politician of the Western Roman Empire.

== Biography ==
Dexter belonged to the Nicomachi, an influential family of senatorial rank. Among his ancestors there was evidently Appius Claudius Tarronius Dexter; his grandfather was the praetorian prefect Virius Nicomachus Flavianus, his father might be identified with his relative Clementianus, while he was probably a nephew of Nicomachus Flavianus.

Continuing the tradition of his family (he claims to follow the example set by Clementianus), he edited a manuscript containing the first ten books of Livy's Ab urbe condita, initially corrected by some Victorinus, then bought by Quintus Aurelius Symmachus, and finally emended by Nichomachus before arriving in the hands of Dexter; all of the manuscripts of the first ten books of Livy's Ab Urbe condita that were subsequently copied through the Middle Ages into modern times are derived by this single manuscript, thanks to which those books have survived. Subscriptions with his name are found at the end of books 3, 4 and 5.

At the time of the praetorian prefecture of Nicomachus Flavianus (431-432) he set up a statue in honour of his grandfather Virius Nicomachus Flavianus, in which he styles himself former praefectus urbi of Rome.

== Bibliography ==
- Martindale, John R., ed. (1980). The Prosopography of the Later Roman Empire: Volume II, AD 395–527. Cambridge: Cambridge University Press. pp. 357–358. ISBN 0-521-20159-4.
