= Aurelii Symmachi =

The Aurelii Symmachi were an aristocratic senatorial family (gens) of the late Roman Empire.

The family received its first offices at the beginning of the 3rd century under emperor Septimius Severus. It further increased its prestige, reaching its peaks in the 4th and 5th centuries. Among the most important members of this family were:

- Aurelius Valerius Tullianus Symmachus, consul in 330
  - Lucius Aurelius Avianius Symmachus, praefectus urbi in 364-365, son of Aurelius Valerius Tullianus Symmachus
- Quintus Aurelius Symmachus, c.340–c.402, orator, consul in 391. Contemporaries considered him the best Latin orator of his age, similar to Cicero. He was the most influential of the Symmachi.
  - Quintus Fabius Memmius Symmachus, son of Quintus Aurelius Symmachus
  - Aurelius Anicius Symmachus, nephew of Quintus Aurelius Symmachus
    - Quintus Aurelius Symmachus the Younger, consul in 446, son of Quintus Fabius Memmius Symmachus
      - Quintus Aurelius Memmius Symmachus, consul in 485, son of Quintus Aurelius Symmachus the Younger
      - Three daughters of Quintus Aurelius Memmius Symmachus: Saint Galla, Proba, and Rusticiana, the first wife of Boethius
      - Boethius, adopted son of Quintus Aurelius Symmachus the Younger

The family had a noteworthy interest in literature, and its members were patrons, editors and historians.

- Lucius Aurelius Avianius Symmachus wrote a few epigrams on members of the Constantinian administration and another unknown literary work.
- Quintus Aurelius Symmachus wrote many letters, edited in ten volumes, five orations, three panegyrics and 49 relations for his office, among which the most famous is the third, written in order to request the restoration of the Altar of Victory; in the last part of his life he dedicated himself to philology.
- Quintus Aurelius Symmachus (consul 446), to whom Macrobius dedicated his De differentiis vel societatibus graeci latinique verbi.
- Quintus Aurelius Memmius Symmachus wrote a Roman History in seven books (now lost), which was used as a source by Jordanes for his Romana; he also helped the publication of the Commentarii in Somnium Scipionis by Macrobius, even directly editing the work. Priscian dedicated him some of his works.

== Bibliography ==
- Martindale, John R., ed. (1980). The Prosopography of the Later Roman Empire: Volume II, AD 395–527. Cambridge: Cambridge University Press. pp. 1044–1047. ISBN 0-521-20159-4.
