= Flavius Gallicanus =

Roman politician

Flavius Gallicanus (floruit 330) was a consul of the Roman Empire in 330. He might be identified with the historical character behind the myth of Saint Gallicanus, who died, according to tradition, in 362, and whose day is June 25.

A Gallicanus is known to have donated to the church of the Saints Peter, Paul, and John the Baptist in Ostia lands worth 869 solidi per year. This Gallicanus should be identified with Flavius or with Ovinius Gallicanus.

According to the unreliable Acts of Saint Gallicanus (in "Acta SS.", June, VII, 31) he was a distinguished general in the Roman–Persian Wars. After his conversion to Christianity he retired to Ostia, founded a hospital and endowed a church built by Constantine I. Under Julian the Apostate he was banished to Egypt, and lived with the hermits in the desert. A small church was built in his honour in the Trastevere of Rome. His relics are at Rome in the church of Sant'Andrea della Valle. The legend of his conversion was dramatized by Hrotsvitha.

== Bibliography ==
- Martindale, John R.; Jones, A. H. M.; Morris, John, eds. (1971). "Flavius Gallicanus 1". The Prosopography of the Later Roman Empire: Volume I, AD 260–395. Cambridge: Cambridge University Press. pp. 382–383. ISBN 0-521-07233-6.

Political offices
Preceded by Constantine Augustus VIII; Constantine Caesar IV	Roman consul 330 with Aurelius Valerius Tullianus Symmachus	Succeeded by Junius Bassus; Ablabius
