= Aurelius Valerius Symmachus Tullianus =

Roman senator and aristocrat

Aurelius Valerius Symmachus Tullianus (fl. 330–337) was a Roman senator and aristocrat. He was appointed consul in 330 by the emperor Constantine.

Writing between 334 and 337 (probably 337), the author Firmicus Maternus noted Tullianus for his austerity, severity, integrity, and Stoicism, though Cameron says this description represents an idealized image of a Roman senator and need not be an accurate depiction of the subject himself. Symmachus probably earned the name Tullianus, referencing Marcus Tullius Cicero, because he was famed as an orator, as were several senatorial descendants of his, including Avianius Symmachus, Quintus Aurelius Symmachus (consul in 391), and Memmius Symmachus (consul 485).

Tullianus may be identical with one Phosphorius who served as proconsul of Achaia in 319. 'Phosphorius' occurs as an informal name (signum) elsewhere in his family and is otherwise rare, but confirmation of the identity is lacking. Tullianus' son was probably the senator Lucius Aurelius Avianius Symmachus.

== Footnotes ==
Political offices
Preceded by Constantine Augustus; Constantine Caesar	Roman consul 330 with Gallicanus	Succeeded by Junius Bassus; Ablabius
