= Symmachus (translator) =

2nd century translator of biblical texts

Symmachus (/ˈsɪməkəs/; Ancient Greek: Σύμμαχος "ally"; fl. late 2nd century AD) was a writer who translated the Hebrew Bible into Greek. His translation was included by Origen in his Hexapla and Tetrapla, which compared various versions of the Hebrew Bible side by side with the Septuagint. Some fragments of Symmachus's version that survive, in what remains of the Hexapla, inspire scholars to remark on the purity and idiomatic elegance of Symmachus' Greek. He was admired by Jerome, who used his work in composing the Vulgate.

== Life ==
Eusebius inferred that Symmachus was an Ebionite (Ἐβιωνίτης Σύμμαχος "Symmachus the Ebionite"), but this is now generally thought to be unreliable. The alternative is that he was a Samaritan who converted to Judaism. Epiphanius' account that Symmachus was a Samaritan who having quarrelled with his own people converted to Judaism is now given greater credence, since Symmachus' exegetical writings give no indication of Ebionism. At some time in his life, he had also written a commentary on the Aramaic Gospel of Matthew, known then as According to the Hebrews.

=== Symmachus ben Joseph ===
A rabbi from the time of the Mishnah, named Symmachus ben Joseph, is identified by some with Symmachus the translator; others hold the claim to be unfounded, although Epiphanius of Salamis puts Symmachus within the time-frame of Rabbi Meir, saying that Symmachus had converted to the Jewish religion after being a Samaritan. The rabbinic Symmachus was a student of Rabbi Meir, and his teachings are mentioned in the Mishnah under the name Sūmkos (Hebrew: סומכוס).

== His translation ==
The inter-relationship between various significant ancient manuscripts of the Old Testament. LXX denotes the original Septuagint.

According to Bruce M. Metzger the Greek translation of the Hebrew Scriptures prepared by Symmachus followed a 'theory and method... the opposite of that of Aquila':

for his aim was to make an elegant Greek rendering. To judge from the scattered fragments that remain of his translation, Symmachus tended to be periphrastic in representing the Hebrew original. He preferred idiomatic Greek constructions in contrast to other versions in which the Hebrew constructions are preserved. Thus he usually converted into a Greek participle the first of two finite verbs connected with a copula. He made copious use of a wide range of Greek particles to bring out subtle distinctions of relationship that the Hebrew cannot adequately express. In more than one passage Symmachus had a tendency to soften anthropomorphic expressions of the Hebrew text.

However, Symmachus aimed to preserve the meaning of his Hebrew source text by a more literal translation than the Septuagint.

Jerome admired his style but faulted his translation in two areas important to Christians, saying that he substituted the Greek word neanis (woman) for parthenos (virgin) in Isaiah 7:14 and Genesis 24:43. Symmachus' Greek translation of the Pentateuch appeared in Origen's Hexapla, in which he had written κεραύνιος (= onyx) for the precious stone known in Hebrew as bareḳet in Exodus 28:17.

== Lost works ==
According to Eusebius, Symmachus also wrote commentaries, then still extant, apparently written to counter the canonical Greek Gospel of Matthew, his Hypomnemata; it may be related to the De distinctione præceptorum, mentioned in the catalogue of the Nestorian metropolitan Abdiso Bar Berika (d.1318). Eusebius also records Origen's statement that he obtained these and others of Symmachus' commentaries on the scriptures from a certain Juliana, who, he says, inherited them from Symmachus himself (Historia Ecclesiae, VI: xvii); Palladius of Galatia (Historia Lausiaca, lxiv) records that he found in a manuscript that was "very ancient" the following entry made by Origen: "This book I found in the house of Juliana, the virgin in Caesarea, when I was hiding there; who said she had received it from Symmachus himself, the interpreter of the Jews". The date of Origen's stay with Juliana was probably 238-41, but Symmachus's version of the Scriptures had already been known to Origen when he wrote his earliest commentaries, ca 228.

== Later traditions ==
From the language of many later writers who speak of Symmachus, he must have been a man of great importance among the Ebionites, for "Symmachians" remained a term applied by Catholics even in the fourth century to the Nazarenes or Ebionites, as we know from the pseudepigraphical imitator of Ambrose, the Ambrosiaster, Prologue to the Epistle to the Galatians, and from Augustine's writings against heretics.

== See also ==
- Aquila of Sinope
- Theodotion
- Hexapla
