= Symmachus ben Joseph =

Symmachus ben Joseph (Hebrew: סוֹמְכוֹס בן יוסף Romanized: Sômǝkôs ben Joseph) (Note: Vocalization diverges in printings but all MSS are consistent with the presented here.) was a Jewish Tanna sage of the fifth generation.

== Biography ==
Rabbi Meir is considered his main teacher. After R. Meir died, and despite R. Judah ben Ilai's reluctance to teach R. Meir's students (who were considered "vexatious" students), Symmachus joined R. Judah ben Ilai's class and debated halakhic matters with him.

Symmachus' brilliance was described as follows:

R. Abbahu stated in the name of R. Johanan: R. Meir had a disciple of the name of Symmachus who said, on every rule concerning a ritual uncleanness, there are forty-eight reasons in support of its uncleanness, and on every rule concerning a ritual cleanness, forty-eight reasons in support of its cleanness.

The name Symmachus may have been common in the classical era among Hebrew speakers, as it may have been a Greek translation of the Hebrew Eleazar. Josephus. writes that Eleazar translates as the name Symmachus, meaning: "the God of my father was my help."

== Teachings ==
He is quoted five times in the Mishna: three times his teachings appear, and twice he quotes an opinion of Rabbi Meir.

He is best known for the following disagreement about judgment in a case of monetary dispute:

These are the words of Symmachus who said that "money which is in dispute - is to be split [equally between the parties]" (ממון המוטל בספק חולקין). The Sages, however, disagreed with him: "It is a fundamental principle in law: One who wishes to extract money from another person, the burden of proof falls on him [the claimant]" (המוציא מחברו עליו הראיה).

Later opinions differ on which situations Symmachus intended for his rule to apply. The Supreme Court of Israel cites the opinion of Symmachus in resolving divorce cases in which it is necessary to divide the assets. Symmachus argues for a division of the assets in cases when it is difficult to unravel the differences between the parties because of a lack of evidence.

== Relation to other individuals named Symmachus ==
Some have tried to identify him with Symmachus the translator, but this view has been generally rejected. In Epiphanius' treatise On Weights and Measures, a certain Symmachus is said to have converted to Judaism from the Samaritan religion at the time of the Roman Emperor Marcus Aurelius who is also called Verus. Rabbi Meir would have been his contemporary. Paladius of Galatia found an insertion from Origen in an ancient manuscript: "This book I found in the house of Juliana, the virgin in Casesarea, when I was hiding there; who said she had received it from Symmachus himself the interpreter of the Jews." Michaël N. van der Meer concludes that the two figures, the Tanna and the translator, were two different people.
