= Lucius Aurelius Avianius Symmachus =

Lucius Aurelius Avianius Symmachus signo Phosphorius (died 376) was an aristocrat of the Roman Empire, and father of Quintus Aurelius Symmachus.

== Biography ==
A member of the aristocratic family of the Symmachi, he was the son of Aurelius Valerius Tullianus Symmachus, consul for 330. He had one daughter and four sons, among whom were Celsinus Titianus and the most influential of the Symmachi, the orator Quintus Aurelius Symmachus. Avianius was among the senators who had not converted to Christianity and continued to practice the traditional state religion of Rome, and was member of several priestly collegia, including the Pontefices Vestae and the quindecimviri sacris faciundi (from 351 to 375).

By January 350 he held the office of praefectus annonae; later that decade he was vicarius urbis Romae. In 361, he went to Antioch (in Syria), where he probably met Libanius, to meet Emperor Constantius II: it is probable that the Roman Senate wanted to assure its loyalty to the ruling emperor after receiving a letter from Julian, cousin and caesar of Constantius, who had been just proclaimed emperor by his troops. On their way back, Symmachus and his colleague Valerius Maximus travelled through Naissus (modern Niš), where they were received by Julian with all the honours.

From April 364 to March 365 he held the office of praefectus urbi of Rome, under the rule of Valentinian I. As prefect, he restored the ancient pons Agrippae on the Tiber (on the place of the modern Ponte Sisto), which took the name of pons Valentiniani; Symmachus even paid for a lavish public celebration for the inauguration of this bridge. Ammianus Marcellinus has a flattering opinion of his mandate.

His house was on the right side of the Tiber, in Trastevere, and was burned down by the plebs during a riot in 367. According to the story told by Ammianus, the riot originated from a rumour, diffused by a member of the plebs, according to which Symmachus, during his prefecture, had said that "he would prefer putting out the limekilns with his own wine, to selling the lime at the price expected of him"; forgetting the prosperity achieved during Symmachus' office, the enraged plebs burnt down his house. Symmachus left the city following this offence caused by "envy", that he tried to heal by writing a literary work. After a while, however, the plebs changed their minds and started supporting Symmachus, even asking for a punishment of the offenders. Symmachus returned to Rome, by request of the Roman Senate, whom he thanked on 1 January 376; the senators, even the Christians, proposed him to Emperor Gratian as praetorian prefect and consul for year 377.

Avianius Symmachus died in 376, as consul-elect. The following year, his memory was honoured with a gilded statue, erected by imperial decree after a request of the Senate, on 29 April.

== Culture ==
Avianius Symmachus is described by his son as a reader of every kind of literature. He composed a small number of epigrams of low quality about members of the Constantinian age, such as Amnius Anicius Iulianus and Lucius Aradius Valerius Proculus.

Among his correspondents there was Vettius Agorius Praetextatus, who was a member of the pagan and senatorial aristocracy.

== Bibliography ==
Primary sources

- Quintus Aurelius Symmachus, Epistulae, i.1-12 (addressed to his father); Orationes, iv (pro patre) e v (pro Trygetio)
- Ammianus Marcellinus, Res Gestae xxxi libri, xxi.12.24, xxvii.3.3-4.

Secondary sources

- Kahlos, Maijastina, Vettius Agorius Praetextatus - Senatorial Life in Between, Acta Instituti Romani Finlandiae n. 26, Roma 2006.
- Lizzi Testa, Rita, Senatori, popolo, papi: il governo di Roma al tempo dei Valentiniani, EDIPUGLIA, 2004, ISBN 88-7228-392-2, pp. 327–333.
- Mazzarino, Santo, Antico, tardoantico ed èra costantiniana, Edizioni Dedalo, 1980, ISBN 88-220-0513-9, pp. 410–414.
- Sogno, Cristiana, Q. Aurelius Symmachus: A Political Biography, University of Michigan Press, 2006, ISBN 0-472-11529-4
- Wace, Henry, "Symmachus (3) Q. Aurelius", Dictionary of Christian Biography and Literature to the End of the Sixth Century A.D., with an Account of the Principal Sects and Heresies, Hendrickson Publishers, Inc., 1999 [1911], ISBN 1-56563-460-8

Political offices
Preceded by Lucius Turcius Apronianus	Praefectus urbi of Rome; April 364 – March 365	Succeeded by Gaius Ceionius Rufius Volusianus
