= Nicomachus Flavianus =

Roman senator

Nicomachus Flavianus (fl. 382–432), sometimes referred to as Flavianus the Younger, was a grammarian and a politician of the Roman Empire. He was the son of Virius Nicomachus Flavianus. He held several offices under emperors Valentinian II (371–392), Theodosius I (379–395), Honorius (393–423), and Valentinian III (425–455); together with his father he supported the usurper Eugenius until his defeat and death (392–394). Flavianus also edited a corrected version of Livy's work.

== Biography ==
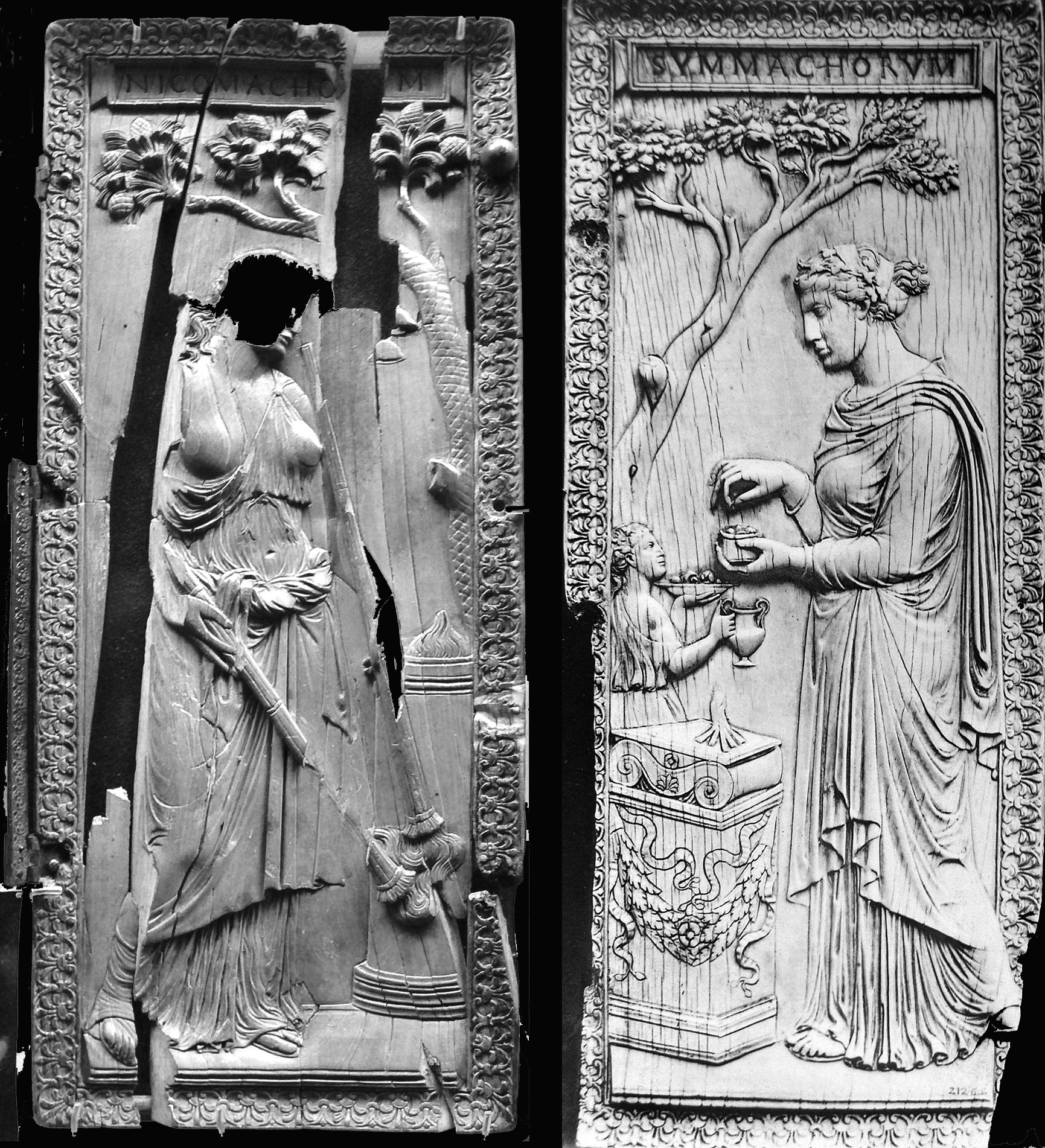
Symmachi–Nicomachi diptych; the left leaf is at the Musée National du Moyen Âge, Paris, the right leaf is at the Victoria and Albert Museum in London.

Flavianus belonged to the Nicomachi, an influential family of senatorial rank. His father was the pagan politician and historian Virius Nicomachus Flavianus, and he had a brother. He married a daughter (who some sources say was called Galla and other sources say is unnamed) of Quintus Aurelius Symmachus, from whom he received over 80 letters, and whose family had a long-time friendship and alliance with the Nicomachi. It may have been in occasion of Flavianus' wedding that the "Nicomachorum-Symmachorum" diptych was produced. Alternatively, it may have been produced on the occasion of the wedding of Galla, daughter of Nicomachus Flavianus and his unnamed wife, with the son of Symmachus. As was traditional for his family, he was patron of Naples; and, sharing a common interest in his family, he edited works of pagan authors of the Roman literature: in particular, around 408 he produced a corrected edition of the first ten books of the Ab Urbe condita of Livy, while he was staying near Enna (he had estates in Sicily). His edition had been corrected by Victorinus before him, then bought by Symmachus, and finally, after Flavianus' edition, emended another time by his nephew Appius Nicomachus Dexter; all of the manuscripts of the first ten books of Livy's Ab Urbe condita that were subsequently copied through the Middle Ages into modern times are derived by this single manuscript, thanks to whom those books have survived.

His political career is reported on an inscription (CIL, VI, 1783). His first office was consularis Campaniae, that is governor of the region of Campania, a position held at a date unknown, but before the following office, the one of proconsul Asiae (382–383), governor of Asia Minor. His father delayed his departure for his province; in this office he was the addressee of some laws later included in the Codex Theodosianus, while Himerius dedicated in his honour three orations. He clubbed a decurion, and for this reason was dismissed from his office, taking a ship to go home. He was later recalled at court by Theodosius I, when the emperor was in Italy (389/391), but he did not receive any office.

After the death of Valentinian II, Eugenius usurped the throne of the Western part of the empire; both father and son sided with the usurper, and Flavianus iunior became praefectus urbi of Rome. After the defeat and death of Eugenius at the battle of the Frigidus (September 394), Flavianus senior committed suicide, while Flavianus iunior received no harm from his support to the usurper, apart having to repay his father's wages as praetorian prefect. He received several letters from his father-in-law Quintus Aurelius Symmachus, a close and influential friend of his father, to suggest him to take part to the senatorial delegation to the emperor (397), in order to rehabilitate himself, but it is probable he did not follow Symmachus' suggestions. However he was invited in late 398 to the celebrations for the inauguration of the Emperor as consul for 399.

He was twice appointed praefectus urbi of Rome, first between 399 and 400 and then again in 408. The total number of prefectures was officially two, as the office held under Eugenius was not recognized, but one inscription refers vaguely to the number of terms, and on his edition of Livius' work there is a note referring to three prefectures. In 414 was sent to Africa together with Caecilianus to investigate a matter.

In 431–432 he was praetorian prefect of Italia, Illyricum and Africa.

== Bibliography ==
Primary sources

- Augustine of Hippo, Civitas Dei
- Codex Theodosianus
- Himerius, Orationes
- Libanius, Orationes
- Quintus Aurelius Symmachus, Epistulae

Secondary sources

- Arnold Hugh Martin Jones, John Robert Martindale, J. Morris, "Nicomachus Flavianus 14", The Prosopography of the Later Roman Empire, Cambridge University Press, 1971, ISBN 0-521-07233-6, pp. 345–346.
- James J. O’Donnell, "The Career of Virius Nicomachus Flavianus". In: Phoenix. Vol. 32, 1978, pp. 129–143 (online).

Political offices
Preceded by Hilarius	Praefectus urbi of Rome; 408	Succeeded by Gabinius Barbarus Pompeianus
