= Altar of Victory =

Altar in the Roman Senate House

The statue of Victory on a coin issued under Augustus, matching its description by Prudentius.

The Altar of Victory (Latin: Ara Victoriae) was located in the Roman Senate House (the Curia Julia) and bore a gold statue of the goddess Victory. The altar was established by Octavian (later Augustus) in 29 BC to commemorate the defeat of Antony and Cleopatra at the Battle of Actium.

== History ==
The statue had been captured by the Romans in 272 BC during the Pyrrhic War and was originally a representation of Nike. It depicted a winged goddess, holding a palm branch and descending to present a laurel wreath.

A modern historian reflects on the importance of the altar and the statue:

At this Altar of Victory senators burned incense, offered prayers annually for the welfare of the empire, took their oaths and pledged on the accession of each new emperor. Thus the statue became one of the most vital links between the Roman state and Roman religion and also a tangible reminder of Rome's great past and her hopes for the future.

== Removal ==
The altar was removed from the curia by the Emperor Constantius II in 357. It was later restored by the Emperor Julian, who was the only emperor after the conversion of Constantine I to adhere to the traditional religion of Rome. The altar was again removed by Gratian in 382.

After Gratian's death, Quintus Aurelius Symmachus, a senator and Prefect of Rome who sought to preserve Rome's religious traditions, in 384 wrote to the new Emperor Valentinian II requesting the restoration of the altar. In the imperial court in Milan, the young emperor denied the request. Ambrose, Bishop of Milan successfully persuaded Valentinian to resist the request to preserve the altar. However, he was not the main person behind the resolution that removed the altar though he did participate in the debate.

Further petitions to restore the altar were deflected in 391 by an edict of the Emperor Theodosius I as part of his efforts to ensure that Christianity was the only religion practised in the empire. The altar was restored by Eugenius during his short-lived rule (392–394), according to Paulinus of Milan in his Life of Ambrose.

Writing in 403, Claudian mentioned that the statue (if not the altar) was then in the Senate House. Sheridan states "Some think that removals and restorations refer to both the Altar of Victory and the Statue of Victory. Others think that the Statue was never removed from its place. There is no statement in the ancient authors as to what happened to the Statue when the Altar was removed and certainty on this point is unattainable." Sheridan further suggests that "the fate of the Altar and Statue of Victory was finally sealed by the law of 408 against heathen statues," citing Codex Theodosianus XVI,10, 19.

== Bibliography ==
- Richard Klein: Symmachus. Eine tragische Gestalt des ausgehenden Heidentums. Darmstadt (Wissenschaftliche Buchgesellschaft [Impulse der Forschung, Band 2]) 1971, ISBN 3-534-04928-4.
- Richard Klein: Der Streit um den Victoriaaltar. Die dritte Relatio des Symmachus und die Briefe 17, 18 und 57 des Mailänder Bischofs Ambrosius. Darmstadt (WBG [Texte zur Forschung Band 7]) 1972, ISBN 3-534-05169-6.
- Sheridan, James J. (1966). "The Altar of Victory—Paganism's Last Battle". L'Antiquité Classique. 35 (1): 186–206. doi:10.3406/antiq.1966.1466.
