= Quintus Aurelius Symmachus =

Roman senator, orator and author (345–402 CE)

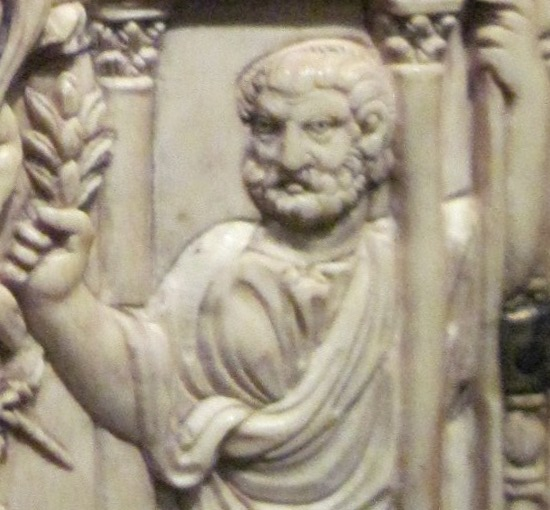
- Probable depiction of Q. Aurelius Symmachus from an ivory diptych depicting his apotheosis.
- Born: c. 345
- Died: c. 402
- Occupation: Politician
- Notable work: Epistolae, Relationes

Quintus Aurelius Symmachus signo Eusebius (/ˈsɪməkəs/, Classical Latin: [ˈsʏmmakʰʊs]; c. 345 – 402) was a Roman statesman, orator, and intellectual. He held the offices of governor of proconsular Africa in 373, urban prefect of Rome in 384 and 385, and consul in 391. Symmachus sought to preserve the traditional religions of Rome at a time when the aristocracy was converting to Christianity, and led an unsuccessful delegation of protest against Emperor Gratian's order to remove the Altar of Victory from the curia, the principal meeting place of the Roman Senate in the Forum Romanum. Two years later he made a famous appeal to Gratian's successor, Valentinian II, in a dispatch that was rebutted by Ambrose, the bishop of Milan. Symmachus's career was temporarily derailed when he supported the short-lived usurper Magnus Maximus, but he was rehabilitated and three years later appointed consul. After the death of Theodosius I, he became an ally of Stilicho, the guardian of Emperor Honorius. In collaboration with Stilicho he was able to restore some of the legislative powers of the Senate. Much of his writing has survived: nine books of letters; a collection of Relationes or official dispatches; and fragments of various orations.

== Life ==
Symmachus was the son of a prominent aristocrat, Lucius Aurelius Avianius Symmachus, who had been urban prefect of Rome twice. His mother, whose name has not survived, was a daughter of Fabius Tatianus, consul in 337 and a two-term urban prefect. He had two brothers, both consulares (provincial governors) and one possibly a Christian, and a sister who may have been the family member that established a connection through marriage between the Symmachi and the Anicii, one of the first Roman families of the highest rank to convert to Christianity.

Symmachus was educated in Gaul, apparently at Bordeaux or Toulouse. In early life he became devoted to literature. In 369, he met Ausonius, and their friendship proved mutually beneficial.

Having discharged the functions of quaestor and praetor, he was appointed Corrector of Lucania and the Bruttii in 365. In 373, he was proconsul of Africa. Probably about the same time, he became a member of the College of Pontiffs. As a representative of the political cursus honorum, Symmachus sought to preserve the ancient religion of Rome at a time when the senatorial aristocracy was converting to Christianity.

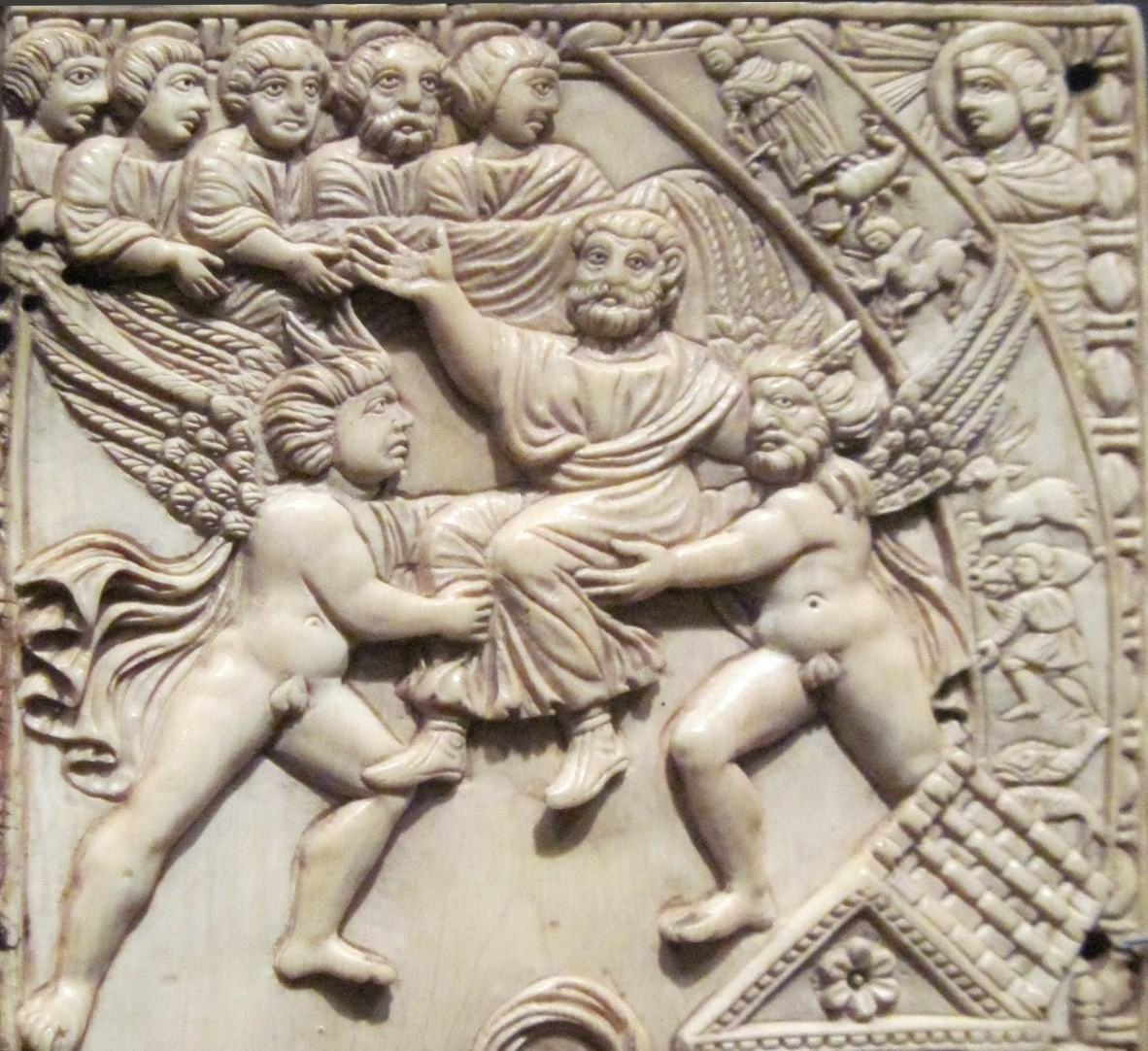
Probable depiction of Symmachus arriving in heaven following his apotheosis. The genii who bear him skyward, as well as the Sun god and zodiacal signs, attest to Symmachus' religious convictions

In 382, the Emperor Gratian, a Christian, ordered the Altar of Victory removed from the Curia, the Roman Senate house in the Forum, and curtailed the sums annually allowed for the maintenance of the Vestal Virgins, and for the public celebration of sacred rites. Symmachus was chosen by the Senate on account of his eloquence to lead a delegation of protest, which the Emperor refused to receive. Two years later, Gratian was assassinated in Lugdunum, and Symmachus, now urban prefect of Rome, addressed an elaborate epistle to Gratian's successor, Valentinian II, in a famous dispatch that was rebutted by Ambrose, the bishop of Milan. In an age when all religious communities credited the divine power with direct involvement in human affairs, Symmachus argues that the removal of the altar had caused a famine and its restoration would be beneficial in other ways. Subtly he pleads for tolerance for traditional cult practices and beliefs that the Empire was poised to suppress in the Theodosian edicts of 391.

It was natural for Symmachus to sympathise with Magnus Maximus who had defeated Gratian. When Maximus was threatening to invade Italy in 387, his cause was openly advocated by Symmachus, who upon the arrival of Theodosius I was impeached for treason, and forced to take refuge in a sanctuary. Having been pardoned through the intervention of numerous and powerful friends, he expressed his contrition and gratitude in an apologetic address to Theodosius, by whom he was not only forgiven, but was received into favour and elevated to the consulship in 391. During the remainder of his life, he appears to have taken an active part in public affairs. The date of his death is unknown, but one of his letters was written as late as 402.

His leisure hours were devoted exclusively to literary pursuits, as is evident from the numerous allusions in his letters to the studies in which he was engaged. His friendship with Ausonius and other distinguished authors of the era proves that he delighted in associating and corresponding with the learned. His wealth must have been prodigious, for in addition to his town mansion on the Caelian Hill and several houses in the city which he lent to his friends. He possessed upwards of a dozen villas in Italy, many detached farms, together with estates in Sicily and Mauretania.

5th-century monk Gerontius of Jerusalem, cited Olimpiodorus when he wrote, "The orator Symmachus...had relatively but a modest income, possessed three magnificent palaces in Rome, as well as fifteen villas to which he could betake himself whenever he needed change."

Symmachus and his real-life associates Vettius Agorius Praetextatus and Virius Nicomachus Flavianus are the main characters of Macrobius's Saturnalia, which was written in the 5th century but set in 384. These three aristocratic intellectuals lead nine others, consisting of fellow noble and non-noble intellectuals, in a discussion of learned topics, dominated by the many-sided erudition of the poet Virgil.

== Writings ==
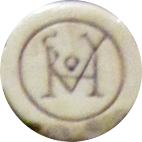
The Symmachus family monogram.

Of his many writings, the following have survived:

- Nine or ten books of letters, published by his son. Many of the letters are notes extending to a few lines only, addressed to a wide circle of relations, friends, and acquaintances. They relate for the most part to matters of little importance. The most famous letter is the most highly finished and important piece in the collection, the celebrated epistle to "Valentinian, Theodosius, and Arcadius" entreating them to restore the Altar of Victory to its ancient position in the senate house.
- A collection of Relationes or official dispatches, which is chiefly composed of the letters written by him when prefect of Rome to the emperors under whom he served.
- Panegyrics, written in his youth, two on Valentinian I and one on the youthful Gratian.
- Fragments of various orations, discovered by Angelo Mai in palimpsests in the Ambrosian library and the Vatican.

According to one of his letters (dated to 401), Symmachus also engaged in the preparation of an edition of Livy's Ab Urbe Condita. Seven manuscripts of the first decade of Livy's extensive work (books 1-10) bear subscriptions including Symmachus' name along with Tascius Victorianus, Appius Nicomachus Dexter, and Nicomachus Flavianus. J.E.G. Zetzel has identified some of their effects to this tradition of the transmission of this portion of Livy's work.

In other letters, Symmachus describes preparations for his shows in the arena. He managed to procure antelopes, gazelles, leopards, lions, bears, bear-cubs, and even some crocodiles. Symmachus also purchased Saxon slaves to fight and die in the games. He was annoyed when twenty-nine of the Saxons strangled each other in their cells on the night before their final scheduled appearance.

One quote of Symmachus from "The Memorial of Symmachus, Prefect of the City" reads (in translation), "We gaze up at the same stars; the sky covers us all; the same universe encompasses us. Does it matter what practical system we adopt in our search for the Truth? The heart of so great a mystery cannot be reached by following one road only."

The style of Symmachus was widely admired in his own time and into the early Middle Ages, but modern scholars have been frustrated by the lack of solid information about the events of his time found in these writings. Consequently, little of his work has been translated into English.

== Family ==
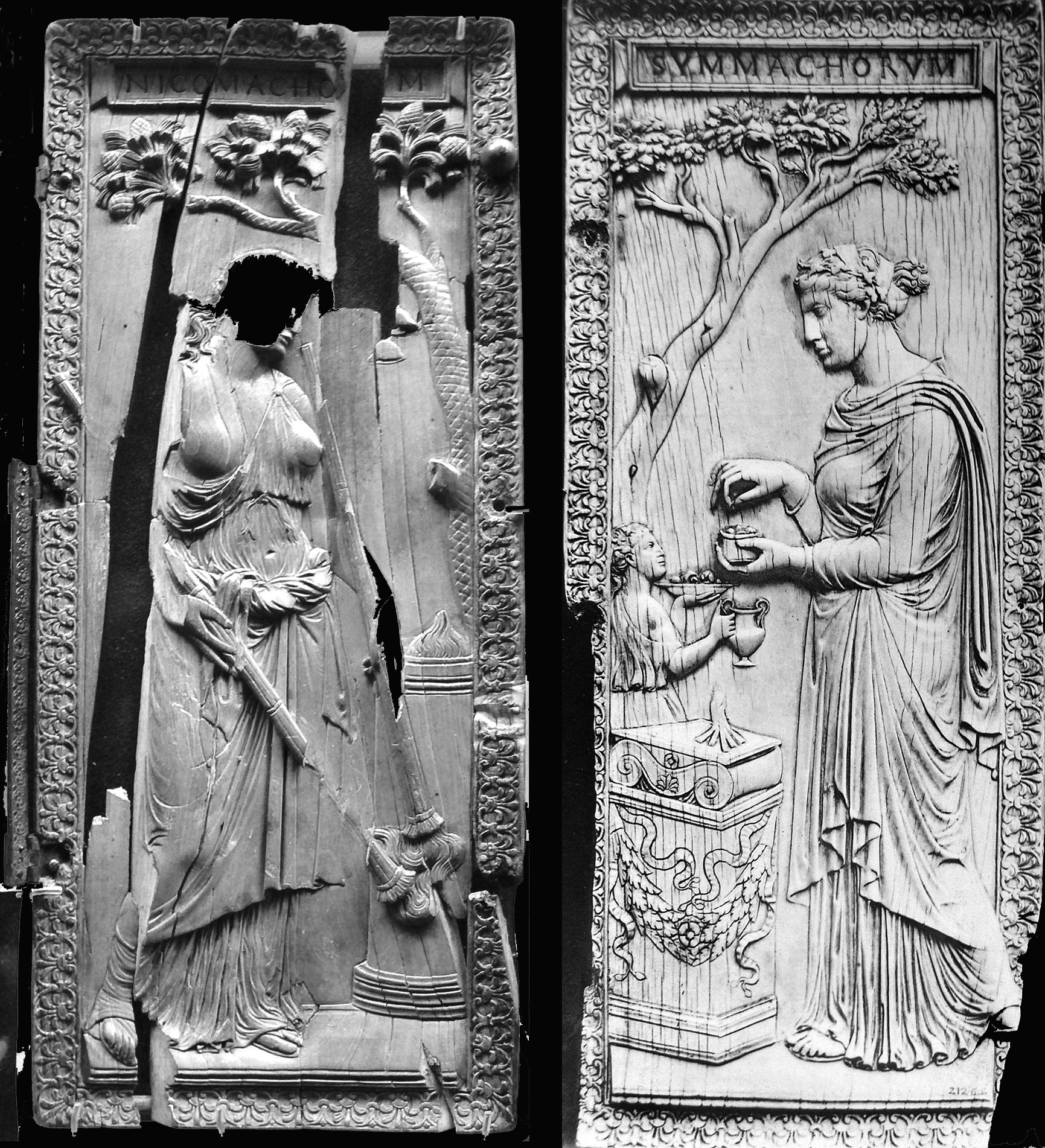
Symmachi–Nicomachi diptych; the left leaf is at the Musée National du Moyen Âge, Paris, the right leaf is at the Victoria and Albert Museum in London. It is possible that this diptych, honouring the bond between the two aristocratic and pagan families of the Symmachi and Nicomachi, was issued in occasion of Memmius' marriage with a woman of the Nicomachi in 401.

Symmachus married Rusticiana, whose parents were Memmius Vitrasius Orfitus, twice urban prefect of Rome (353-355; 357-359) and Constantia, possibly the daughter of Constantina and Hannibalianus. Their children included:

- Galla, their oldest child who married Symmachus' friend Nicomachus Flavianus
- Quintus Fabius Memmius Symmachus, aristocrat

== See also ==
- Symmachi–Nicomachi diptych
- Quintus Fabius Memmius Symmachus, his son, who edited Aurelius' letters for publication

== Notes ==
Political offices
| Preceded by Valentinian Augustus IV; Neoterius | Roman consul 391 with Eutolmius Tatianus | Succeeded by Arcadius Augustus II; Rufinus |
| Preceded by Aventius | Praefectus urbi of Rome; 384–385 | Succeeded by Pinianus |
| Preceded by Sextius Rusticus Julianus | Governor of Africa; 373–374 | Succeeded by Paulus Constantius |
