= Arrianus =

Arrianus may refer to:

- Arrianus (bishop), bishop of Ionia, (c. 363–?) and an Anomoean
- Arrianus (jurist), Roman jurisconsult
- Arrianus (poet), Greek poet who made a Greek translation in hexameter verse of Virgil's Georgics, possibly conflated with Adrianus (poet)
- Arrian or Arrianus (c. 86/89–c. after 146/160), Greek historian, public servant, military commander and philosopher of the Roman period
- Arrianus (historian), historical writer of probably around the 3rd century CE
- Lucius Annius Arrianus, Roman consul 243 CE
- Arrianus (astronomer), Greek astronomer

== See also ==
- Arianus (disambiguation)
- Arius
