= Lucius Valerius Messalla (consul 280) =

Roman consul in 280 AD

(Lucius Valerius) Messalla (fl. 3rd century) was a Roman senator.

== Life ==
Messalla is assumed to be a member of the third century Patrician gens Valeria, possibly the son of Lucius Valerius Poplicola Balbinus Maximus. In 280 he was appointed consul prior alongside Vettius Gratus.

Christian Settipani has suggested that Valerius Maximus Basilius, praefectus urbi of Rome in 319, was his son.

== Ancestry ==
Ancestors of Lucius Valerius Messalla

16. Lucius Valerius Messalla Thrasea Priscus
8. Lucius Valerius Messalla
17. Coelia Balbina
4. Lucius Valerius Claudius Acilius Priscillianus Maximus
18. Tiberius Claudius Cleobulus
9. Claudia Acilia Priscilliana
19. Acilia Frestana
2. Lucius Valerius Poplicola Balbinus Maximus
1. Lucius Valerius Messalla

== Sources ==
- Martindale, John R.; Jones, A. H. M.; Morris, John, eds. (1971). The Prosopography of the Later Roman Empire: Volume I, AD 260–395. Cambridge: Cambridge University Press. ISBN 0-521-07233-6.
- Mennen, Inge, Power and Status in the Roman Empire, AD 193-284 (2011)

Political offices
Preceded by Marcus Aurelius Probus, Nonius Paternus	Consul of the Roman Empire; 280 with Vettius Gratus	Succeeded by Marcus Aurelius Probus, Junius Tiberianus
