= Valerius Maximus (praetorian prefect) =

Roman statesman

Valerius Maximus (fl. 325–337) was a Roman senator.

== Life ==
Valerius Maximus was a member of the fourth century patrician gens Valeria, and probably the son of Valerius Maximus signo Basilius, urban prefect of Rome in 319. He served as the vicarius orientis in 325 before being appointed the eastern praetorian prefect, probably in late 326, when the emperor Constantine I returned from Italy. This was an unusual appointment, as the office of praetorian prefect was reserved for members of the Equestrian order, not senators, and it displayed the emperor's confidence in Valerius Maximus, allowing him to exercise command over the extensive resources of the East. He continued to serve Constantine in this role throughout 327 and 328, relinquishing the office in early 329 after Constantine returned from Gaul.

During this period, in 327, Valerius Maximus was appointed consul posterior, alongside Flavius Constantius. Then in late 331, he was probably sent to Gaul with the Caesar Constantius II, serving as Constantius' praetorian prefect. Valerius Maximus served him there until late 333 or early 334, when Constantius returned to his father's court at Constantinople.

In around 336, Valerius Maximus was appointed praetorian prefect for a third time, this time accompanying the Caesar Dalmatius to the provinces along the Danubian frontier, which had been assigned to him as the territory he was to manage, in Constantine's planned administrative division of the empire. He served under Dalmatius until 337, when Valerius Maximus was replaced shortly before the murder of Dalmatius in the wake of the death of Constantine I.

It is speculated that Valerius Maximus was married twice. Christian Settipani has speculated that his first marriage may have been to Septimia Bassa, daughter of Septimius Bassus. They possibly had one son together, as his second nomen and cognomen suggest, named Lucius Valerius Septimius Bassus. His second marriage was possibly to a Vulcacia, supposedly the daughter of Neratius Junius Flavianus and wife Vulcacia. It has been postulated that they had two children, a son, Maximus, and a daughter, Valeria, who may have become a Christian through her possible marriage, as the nomina and cognomen of one of their children supports, to Rufius Maecius Placidus, consularis vir in 370, son of Postumius Rufius Festus Avienus and wife Maecia Placida.

== Ancestry ==
Ancestors of Valerius Maximus

16. Lucius Valerius Claudius Acilius Priscillianus Maximus
8. Lucius Valerius Poplicola Balbinus Maximus
4. Lucius Valerius Messalla
2. Valerius Maximus signo Basilius
1. Valerius Maximus

== Sources ==
- Martindale, John R.; Jones, A. H. M.; Morris, John, eds. (1971). The Prosopography of the Later Roman Empire: Volume I, AD 260–395. Cambridge: Cambridge University Press. ISBN 0-521-07233-6.

Political offices
Preceded by Constantine Augustus VII; Constantius Caesar	Roman consul 327 with Flavius Constantius	Succeeded by Flavius Ianuarinus; Vettius Iustus
