= Lucius Valerius Septimius Bassus =

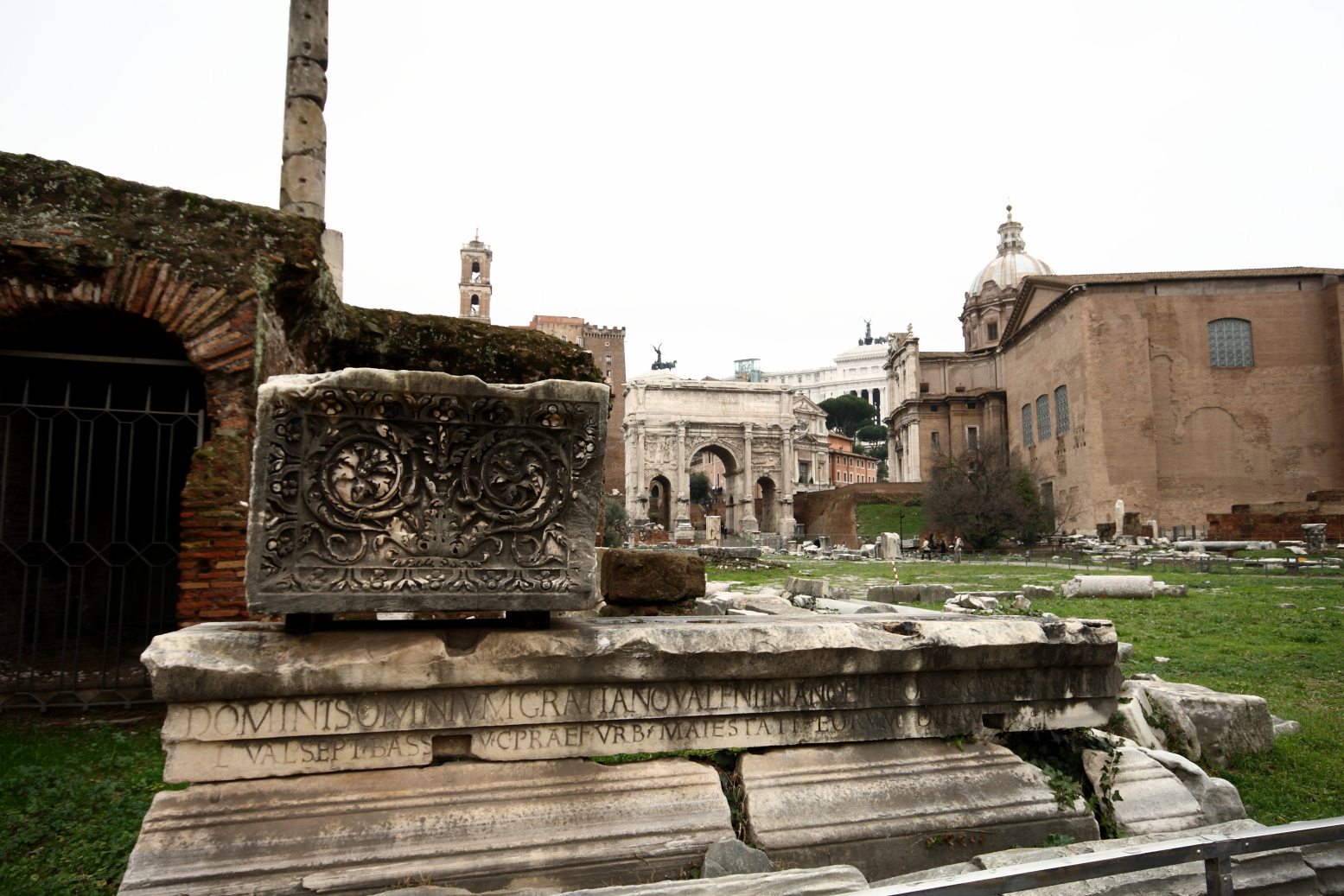
Inscription in the Roman Forum, dedicated by Lucius Valerius Septimius Bassus, praefectus urbi of Rome in 379 or 383

Lucius Valerius Septimius Bassus (c. 328 - aft. 379 or 383) was a Roman politician.

== Life ==
He was the son of Valerius Maximus and first wife Septimia Bassa.

He was praefectus urbi Romae under the emperors Gratian, Valentinian II and Theodosius I, between 379 (the year of Thedosius's ascension) and 383 (the year of Gratian's death).

He possibly married Adelphia, as their son's nomina and cognomen suggest, daughter of Clodius Celsinus Adelphius and wife Faltonia Betitia Proba, and had a son named Valerius Adelphius Bassus (fl. 383 and 392), vir consularis and consul. Venet. in 383 and in 392, in turn the father of Valerius Adelphius and the paternal grandfather of Adelphia, wife of Anicius Probus (fl. 424–459), praetor in 424 and vir illustris in 459, son of Anicius Hermogenianus Olybrius and wife and cousin Anicia Juliana, the possible parents of emperor Anicius Olybrius.

== Ancestry ==
Ancestors of Lucius Valerius Septimius Bassus

16. Lucius Valerius Poplicola Balbinus Maximus
8. Lucius Valerius Messalla
4. Valerius Maximus Basilius
2. Valerius Maximus
1. Lucius Valerius Septimius Bassus
24. Lucius Septimius ...
12. Lucius Septimius Severus
6. Septimius Bassus
26: Pomponius Bassus
13. Pomponia Bassa
27. Pomponia Gratidia
3. Septimia Bassa
