= Vettius Gratus (consul 250) =

Roman senator and consul in 250

(Gaius) Vettius Gratus (fl. 3rd century) was a Roman senator who was appointed consul in AD 250.

== Biography ==
A member of the Patrician gens Vetti, Vettius Gratus was related to the consuls Gaius Vettius Gratus Atticus Sabinianus (possibly his brother or cousin) and Gaius Vettius Gratus Sabinianus (possibly his grandson or grand-nephew).

In AD 250, Vettius Gratus was appointed consul posterior, serving alongside the emperor Decius.

It is speculated that Vettius Gratus had a son, Gratus, who became consul in AD 280.

== Sources ==
- Martindale, John R.; Jones, A. H. M.; Morris, John, eds. (1971). The Prosopography of the Later Roman Empire: Volume I, AD 260–395. Cambridge: Cambridge University Press. ISBN 0-521-07233-6.
- Mennen, Inge, Power and Status in the Roman Empire, AD 193-284 (2011)

Political offices
| Preceded by Lucius Fulvius Gavius Numisius Aemilianus II; Lucius Naevius Aquilinus | Consul of the Roman Empire; 250 with Gaius Messius Quintus Traianus Decius II | Succeeded by Gaius Messius Quintus Traianus Decius III; Quintus Herennius Etruscus Messius Decius |
