= Arius (disambiguation) =

Arius was a Christian priest in Alexandria, Egypt in the early fourth century.

Arius may also refer to:

- Arius (fish), a genus of catfishes
- Arius Didymus, a citizen of Alexandria
- Hari River, a river known in Latin as the Arius
- Podocarpus costalis, species of plants native to the Philippines and Taiwan

== See also ==
- Arian (disambiguation)
- Arianus (disambiguation)
- Arrianus (disambiguation)
- Arianism
