= Gaius Domitius Dexter =

Roman consul

Gaius Domitius Dexter (fl. 2nd century) was a Roman senator who was appointed consul twice: firstly as suffect consul prior to AD 183, and secondly as ordinary consul in AD 196 with Lucius Valerius Messalla Thrasea Priscus as his colleague.

== Biography ==
Domitius Dexter's origins are unknown. A member of the Senate, he was appointed consul suffectus sometime prior to AD 183, most probably during the last years of the reign of Marcus Aurelius. From 183 to 185, he was the Proconsular imperial legate (governor) of Syria. It has been speculated that during this time he enjoyed a cordial relationship with the future emperor Septimius Severus, who was posted as the legatus legionis or commander of the Legio IV Scythica during his time as governor.

Domitius Dexter was a key supporter of Severus’ bid for the imperial title after the murder of Pertinax. In gratitude for his support, Severus appointed Domitius Dexter as praefectus urbi of Rome in June 193. He held the post during an extended period when Severus was absent from Rome, having gone to the east to deal with his rival Pescennius Niger, reflecting the emperor's trust in his subordinate. Perhaps he was still in the office when he was elected consul prior alongside Lucius Valerius Messalla Thrasea Priscus in AD 196.

== Sources ==
- Birley, Anthony, Septimius Severus: The African Emperor (1999)
- Dąbrowa, Edward, The Governors of Roman Syria from Augustus to Septimius Severus (1998)
- Mennen, Inge, Power and Status in the Roman Empire, AD 193-284 (2011)

Political offices
Preceded by Uncertain	Consul suffectus of the Roman Empire before 183 with uncertain	Succeeded by Uncertain
Preceded by Publius Julius Scapula Tertullus Priscus, and Quintus Tineius Clemens	Consul of the Roman Empire; 196 with Lucius Valerius Messalla Thrasea Priscus	Succeeded by Titus Sextius Magius Lateranus, and Cuspius Rufinus
