= Marcus Vipstanus Gallus =

Roman senator

- Born: c. 28 BC
- Died: after AD 18
- Known for: Roman senator, Suffect consul in AD 18
- Spouse: Valeria?
- Children: Lucius Vipstanus Poplicola, Gaius Vipstanus Messalla Gallus, possibly Gaius Vipstanus Apronianus
- Relatives: Lucius Vipstanus Gallus (brother/relative)

Marcus Vipstanus Gallus (born around 28 BC, died after AD 18) was a Roman senator at the beginning of the first century AD. He served as suffect consul in 18 with Gaius Rubellius Blandus as his colleague.

He likely came from the area of Cliternia, among the Sabines and Aequi. He was a homo novus, the first of his family to attain the consulship. His relative (perhaps brother) Lucius Vipstanus Gallus served as praetor and died in 17. An inscription from the Athenian Acropolis honors both brothers.

Marcus’s suffect consulship in 18 may have begun in August or October, possibly replacing Gaius Annius Pollio who abdicated before the year’s end. He may have married Valeria, likely the daughter of the consul of 3 BC, Marcus Valerius Messalla Messallinus, whose friendship with Tiberius may have helped secure Marcus’s promotion.

His son, Lucius Vipstanus Poplicola, became an ordinary consul in 48, and another son, Gaius Vipstanus Messalla Gallus, served as suffect consul in the same year. Some genealogies also link him with Gaius Vipstanus Apronianus, consul in 59, suggesting a possible connection to the gens Apronia.
