= Lucius Valerius Poplicola Balbinus Maximus =

Roman senator appointed consul in 253

Lucius Valerius Poplicola Balbinus Maximus (fl. 3rd century) was a Roman senator.

== Life ==
Valerius Balbinus Maximus was a member of the third century gens Valeria which by now had reached Patrician status. He was probably the son of Lucius Valerius Claudius Acilius Priscillianus Maximus, and like his father, he began his career by serving as one of the sevir equitum Romanorum at the annual review of the equites. He was then appointed the triumvir capitalis (or manager of the prisons), probably for a year. Next, he was an imperial candidate for the office of quaestor, and this was followed by his candidature for the office of praetor tutelaris (the official responsible for matters of guardianship), which he probably was nominated for prior to 240.

Valerius Balbinus Maximus was then appointed as legatus proconsulis in the province of Asia. He reached the office of consul in 253, serving as consul posterior alongside the emperor Volusianus, until Volusianus was murdered in the first few months of that year. His imperial successor Aemilianus may have replaced Valerius Balbinus Maximus with a suffect consul, although Aemilianus himself did not assume the position of consul during his brief reign.

Sometime between 254 and 260, Valerius Balbinus Maximus served as the curator rei publicae Laurentium Lavinatium item cognoscens ad sacras appellationes (curator for the public matters of two Italian towns and deputy judge). His post-consular career saw him remain in Italy. He served as curator aquarum et miniciae (official in charge of the distribution of water and grain in Rome), followed by his acting as praefectus alimentorum viae Flaminiae (or officer responsible for maintaining the Via Flaminia and ensuring the provision of food to Rome). However, Valerius Poplicola Balbinus Maximus did not achieve a proconsular governorship, nor a second consulship.

Valerius Balbinus Maximus was probably the father of Lucius Valerius Messalla, who was consul in 280.

== Ancestry ==
Ancestors of Lucius Valerius Poplicola Balbinus Maximus

16. Lucius Vipstanus Poplicola Messalla
8. Lucius Valerius Messalla Thrasea Priscus
17. Helvidia Priscilla
4. Lucius Valerius Messalla
18. Marcus Aquilius Coelius Apollinaris
9. Coelia Balbina
2. Lucius Valerius Claudius Acilius Priscillianus Maximus
20. Tiberius Cludius Cleobulus
10. Tiberius Claudius Cleobulus
21. Acilia
5. Claudia Acilia Priscilliana
22. Manius Acilius Glabrio
11. Acilia Frestana
1. Lucius Valerius Poplicola Balbinus Maximus

== Sources ==
- Mennen, Inge, Power and Status in the Roman Empire, AD 193-284 (2011)

Political offices
| Preceded by Trebonianus Gallus Augustus II; Volusianus Augustus | Roman consul 253 with Volusianus Augustus II | Succeeded by Valerian Augustus II; Gallienus Augustus |
