= Gaius Vettius Gratus Atticus Sabinianus =

Roman senator appointed consul in 242

Gaius Vettius Gratus Atticus Sabinianus (fl. 3rd century) was a Roman senator who was appointed consul in AD 242.

== Biography ==
A member of the newly established Patrician Gens Vettii, Atticus Sabinianus was probably the son of Gaius Vettius Gratus Sabinianus who was a Roman consul in AD 221. His career followed almost exactly that of his father's. After serving as the Quattuorvir viarum curandum (responsible for the upkeep of Rome's important roads) in around AD 228, he then had a brief turn in the military, serving as the sevir equitum Romanorum (or commander) of the 3rd Turmae.

Returning to Rome, Atticus Sabinianus was selected as an imperial candidate for the office of quaestor in around AD 234, followed by his nomination for the office of praetor, probably around AD 239. He was possibly appointed to the role of Praefectus frumenti dandi (or Prefect responsible for the distribution of Rome's free grain dole) in around AD 240.

Atticus Sabinianus’ next appointment was as the curator of the Via Flaminia, and included responsibility for the supply of food into Rome, probably in AD 241. He was then elected as consul prior alongside Gaius Asinius Lepidus Praetextatus in AD 242.

It has been speculated that Atticus Sabinianus was married to the sister of Gaius Asinius Lepidus Praetextatus and that they had a son who may have been the Virius Gratus who was consul in AD 280.

== Sources ==
- Mennen, Inge, Power and Status in the Roman Empire, AD 193-284 (2011)

Political offices
| Preceded by Marcus Antonius Gordianus II; Clodius Pompeianus | Consul of the Roman Empire; 242 with Gaius Asinius Lepidus Praetextatus | Succeeded by Lucius Annius Arrianus; Gaius Cervonius Papus |
