= Maximus (urban prefect under Julian) =

Roman politician

Maximus (floruit 361–363) was a Roman politician.

== Biography ==
Maximus was a member of the Roman senatorial class. It is speculated that he was the son of Valerius Maximus and second wife possibly a Vulcacia, supposedly the daughter of a Neratius Junius Flavianus. It has been postulated that they had two children, a son, Maximus, and a daughter, Valeria, who may have become a Christian through her possible marriage to a Rufius Maecius Placidus.

Probably, it was Maximus to be sent by the usurper Magnentius to Emperor Constantius II and Vetranio in 350.

In the late 361, Maximus and Lucius Aurelius Avianius Symmachus, both sent by the Roman Senate to Emperor Constantius II, meet Julian at Naissus. Julian received them with all honors, then he appointed Maximus as praefectus urbi of Rome in place of Tertullus (praefectus urbi); his choice was motivated by the desire to please Vulcacius Rufinus, uncle of Maximus. Maximus was still in charge on January 28 362, as attested an inscription.

During his tenure, the alimentaria was amply provided, which placated the inhabitants of Rome.

The senator Maximus can be identified with the praefectus urbi of Rome from December 361 to February 363.

Ammianus Marcelinus named him as Maximus, the orator Quintus Aurelius Symmachus refers to him as Clytholias Maximus and finally we find him as Artorius Clytholias Maximus.

Clytholias Maximus was nephew of Vulcatius Rufinus and Neratius Cerealis and therefore a first cousin of Constantius Gallus (son of Galla, and half-brother of Julian the Apostate).

He may have married Saint Melania the Elder. He may also be related, or identical with, a Basilius who served as governor of Achaea around the same period; both were probably descended from Valerius Maximus Basilius, praefectus urbi from 319 to 323.

== Bibliography ==
- «Maximus 13», PLRE I, p. 582.
- Henry M. Gwatkin, Studies of Arianism: Chiefly Referring to the Character and Chronology of the Reaction which Followed the Council of Nicea Wipf and Stock Publishers, ISBN 9781597521963.
- Louis Sébastien Le Nain de Tillemon, Histoire des empereurs et des autres princes qui ont régné durant les six premiers siecles de l'Eglise.
