= Junius Tiberianus (consul 281) =

Late 3rd/early 4th-century Roman senator and consul

Junius Tiberianus (fl. late 3rd to early 4th centuries) was a Roman senator who was appointed consul in AD 281.

== Biography ==
The son of the consular Gaius Junius Tiberianus, Tiberianus was a member of the Roman Senate. In AD 281, Tiberianus was elevated to the consulship, serving as consul posterior alongside the emperor Marcus Aurelius Probus. He later served as Proconsular governor of Asia around AD 295 or 296.

Tiberianus also served as Praefectus Urbi of Rome from September 12, 303 to January 4, 304. At some stage, he and 12 other senators each contributed 400,000 sesterces, probably for the construction of a building.

== Sources ==
- Christol, Michel, Essai sur l'évolution des carrières sénatoriales dans la seconde moitié du IIIe siècle ap. J.C. (1986).
- Martindale, John R.; Jones, A. H. M.; Morris, John, eds. (1971). The Prosopography of the Later Roman Empire: Volume I, AD 260–395. Cambridge: Cambridge University Press. ISBN 0-521-07233-6.

Political offices
Preceded by Lucius Valerius Messalla; Gratus	Consul of the Roman Empire; 281 with Marcus Aurelius Probus Augustus IV	Succeeded by Marcus Aurelius Probus Augustus V Victorinus
