= Valeria gens =

Ancient Roman family

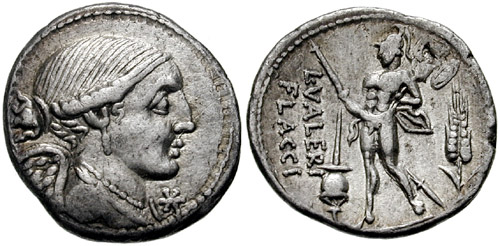
Denarius of Lucius Valerius Flaccus, consul in 100 BC, and later magister equitum to the dictator Sulla.

The gens Valeria was a patrician family at ancient Rome, prominent from the very beginning of the Republic to the latest period of the Empire. Publius Valerius Poplicola was one of the consuls in 509 BC, the year that saw the overthrow of the Tarquins, and the members of his family were among the most celebrated statesmen and generals at the beginning of the Republic. Over the next ten centuries, few gentes produced as many distinguished men, and at every period the name of Valerius was constantly to be found in the lists of annual magistrates, and held in the highest honour. Several of the emperors claimed descent from the Valerii, whose name they bore as part of their official nomenclature.

A number of unusual privileges attached to this family, including the right to burial within the city walls, and a special place for its members in the Circus Maximus, where the unique honour of a throne was granted them. The house built by Poplicola at the foot of the Velian Hill was the only one whose doors were permitted to open into the street. The historian Barthold Georg Niebuhr conjectured that, during the transition from the monarchy to the Republic, the Valerii were entitled to exercise royal power on behalf of the Titienses, one of the three Romulean tribes that made up the Roman people.

Although one of the most noble and illustrious families of the Roman aristocracy, from the very beginning the Valerii were notable for their advocacy of plebeian causes, and many important laws protecting the rights of the plebeians were sponsored by the Valerii. As with many other ancient patrician houses, the family also acquired plebeian branches, which must have been descended either from freedmen of the Valerii, or from members of the family who, for one reason or another, had gone over to the plebeians.

== Origin ==
According to tradition, the Valerii were of Sabine descent, having come to Rome with Titus Tatius, shortly after the founding of the city. However, their nomen, Valerius, is a patronymic surname derived from the Latin praenomen Volesus or Volusus, which in turn is derived from valere, to be strong. Volesus, or Volesus Valerius, the eponymous ancestor of the gens, is said to have been a powerful warrior in the retinue of the Sabine king. Several generations later, another Volesus Valerius was the father of Publius, Marcus, and Manius, three brothers from whom the oldest branches of the family claimed descent.

== Praenomina ==
The earliest of the Valerii known to history bore the praenomen Volesus, which continued to enjoy occasional use among the Valerii of the early Republic. However, most stirpes of the Valerii favoured Publius, Marcus, Manius, and Lucius. Several branches of the family also used Gaius, while the Valerii Faltones employed Quintus, and the Valerii Asiatici of imperial times used Decimus. Other names are seldom found among the Valerii, although in one instance Potitus, an ancient surname of the gens, was revived as a praenomen by the Valerii Messallae during the first century. Examples of Aulus, Numerius, Sextus, Tiberius, and Titus are found in inscriptions.

== Branches and cognomina ==
The oldest branches of the Valerii bore the surnames Poplicola, Potitus, and Maximus, with Volusus being used by the first generations of the Potiti and Maximi. Later families bore various cognomina, including Corvus or Corvinus, Falto, Flaccus, Laevinus, Messalla, Tappo, and Triarius. Most other surnames found in Republican times belonged to freedmen or clientes of the Valerii. The surnames Acisculus, Catullus, Flaccus, and Barbatus appear on coins. A few Valerii are known without any cognomina, but they achieved little of significance.

Poplicola, also found as Publicola and Poplicula, belongs to a class of surnames referring to the character of the bearer. Derived from populus and colo, the name might best be explained as "one who courts the people." The cognomen first appears in history as the surname given to Publius Valerius, one of the consuls chosen in 509 BC to serve alongside Lucius Junius Brutus. Despite his patrician background, he made a considerable effort to win the support of the plebeians, averting a breach between the two orders at the inception of the Republic. Poplicola seems to have been the original form, while in inscriptions Publicola is more common, and Poplicula is occasionally found. Publicola is found in literary sources from the end of the Republic, including Livy and Cicero.

The Valerii Potiti were descended from Marcus Valerius Volusus, the brother of Poplicola, who fell in battle at Lake Regillus. The surname Potitus seems to be derived from potio, to place someone under one's power, and might be translated as "leader". This family flourished from the early years of the Republic down to the Samnite Wars, when the cognomen seems to have been replaced by Flaccus, a surname first borne by one of the Potiti, who must have been flabby or had floppy ears. Potitus was later revived as a praenomen by the Valerii Messallae, a practice that was common in aristocratic families toward the end of the Republic. As a distinct family, the Valerii Flacci continued down to the first century AD.

Maximus, the superlative of magnus, "great", (Note: While Maximus might be taken to mean that Manius was the "greatest" of the brothers, either physically or because of his reputation, it could also mean that he was the eldest brother; according to tradition he was already elderly at the time of his dictatorship in 494 BC.) was the cognomen of the Valerii descended from the third brother, Manius Valerius Volusus, who first bore the surname. The Valerii Maximi appear in history down to the First Punic War, after which time the surname was replaced by Messalla or Messala, a cognomen derived from the city of Messana in Sicilia. The first to bear this name received it after relieving Messana from a Carthaginian blockade in 264 BC. The Valerii Messallae held numerous consulships and other high offices in the Roman state, remaining prominent well into imperial times. Some of them had additional surnames, including Barbatus, "bearded", as well as Niger and Rufus, originally referring to someone with black or red hair. The names Valerius Maximus and Valerius Messalla occur as late as the third century, but the consular family of that age may have been descended from the Valerii through the female line, and more properly belonged to the Vipstani.

The branch of the Valerii Maximi that gave rise to the Messallae also bore the surname Corvinus, a diminutive of Corvus, a raven. The first of this family was Marcus Valerius Corvus, who in his youth earned everlasting renown for his combat against a giant Gaul in 349 BC. Corvus defeated his adversary with the help of a raven that repeatedly flew in the barbarian's face. He held the consulship six times, was dictator twice, and reached the age of one hundred. The two forms of this surname are interchangeable, but the hero is usually referred to as Corvus, while Corvinus generally refers to his descendants.

Another branch of the Valerii Maximi bore the surname Lactucinus, derived from Lactuca, lettuce, the cognomen of an early member of the family. Such names, referring to objects, were quite common at Rome. The first of this family was a son of the first Valerius Maximus, but the surname was of brief duration; the last mention of the Valerii Lactucinae is early in the fourth century BC.

The cognomen Laevinus, meaning "left-handed", belonged to a family of the Valerii that was prominent for about a century, beginning with the Pyrrhic War, in 280 BC. This family may have been another offshoot of the Valerii Maximi, as the surname first appears in connection with the trial of Spurius Cassius Vecellinus in 485 BC. They continued long after they had ceased to have any importance in the Roman state, and the family is mentioned as late as the end of the first century AD.

The Valerii Faltones flourished at the end of the third century BC, first appearing at the end of the First Punic War. Their relationship to the other Valerii is not immediately apparent, as none of the older stirpes of the gens used the praenomen Quintus, but they may have been a cadet branch of the Valerii Maximi, whose surname disappears around this time. The surname Falto is another form of Falco, referring to a falcon, and was commonly given to someone with inward-pointing toes, resembling talons. (Note: The modern expression is "pigeon-toed".)

The plebeian Valerii Triarii belong to the time of Cicero, in the first century BC. None of them rose higher than the rank of praetor, and the family was of brief duration. Their surname, Triarius, seems to allude to their military service; in the Roman army of this period, a triarius was a soldier of the third rank, the heavily armed reserve infantry, often consisting of older, wealthier men, and the last line of defense in battle.

Catullus seems to be another orthography of Catulus, a surname of the Lutatia gens, referring to a whelp, cub, or puppy. The Valerii Catulli appear in the first century BC, beginning with the renowned poet, and their surname continued through the first century of the Empire. One of the Catulli bore the additional surname of Messalinus, previously associated with the Valerii Messallae, but it is unclear whether the Catulli were descended from the Messallae, or whether the surname entered the family at a later time. The pairing of Catullus Messalinus was also borne by one of the Valerii Asiatici, but again the nature of the relationship between these families is unknown.

Asiaticus, the surname of the only major family of the Valerian gens to emerge in imperial times, belongs to a class of cognomina typically derived from the locations of military exploits. In this instance the source of the name is not apparent, although it might allude to some connection with the Cornelii Scipiones; Lucius Cornelius Scipio Asiaticus was the younger brother of Scipio Africanus, and his surname was passed down in his family for several generations. The Valerii Asiatici were closely connected with the imperial family from the time of Caligula to that of Hadrian, and accounted for several consulships.

== Members ==
This list includes abbreviated praenomina. For an explanation of this practice, see filiation.

=== Early Valerii ===
- Volesus or Volusus, the eponymous ancestor of the gens, is said to have come to Rome with Titus Tatius during the time of Romulus, the first King of Rome.
- Marcus Valerius, One of the fetiales appointed by Tullus Hostilius to sign a treaty with Alba Longa, preceding the duel of the Horatii and Curiatii, in which each side agreed to accept subjugation under the other if their champions were defeated.
- Volesus Valerius, a descendant of the first Volesus, was the father of Publius Valerius Poplicola, Marcus Valerius Volusus, and Manius Valerius Volusus Maximus.
- Valeria, appointed the first priestess of Fortuna Muliebris in 488 BC.

=== Valerii Poplicolae ===
- Publius Valerius Vol. f. Poplicola, or Publicola, consul in 509 BC, the first year of the Republic; he triumphed over the forces of the king. Consul again in 508, 507, and 504, when he triumphed over the Sabines.
- Marcus Valerius P. f. Vol. n. Poplicola, perished at the Battle of Lake Regillus, after recovering the body of his uncle, Marcus Valerius Volusus. According to Dionysius, his brother Publius was also slain, but this appears to be a mistake, as Publius was consul twice after this, although he did fall in battle during his second consulship.
- Publius Valerius P. f. Vol. n. Poplicola, consul in 475 and 460 BC, and interrex in 462; he triumphed over the Veientines and Sabines during his first consulship, but in his second, he was killed in recovering the capitol from Appius Herdonius.
- Lucius Valerius P. f. P. n. Poplicola Potitus, opposed the decemvirs, and was elected consul for the year 449 BC. He defeated the Aequi and the Volsci, and when the senate refused him a triumph, the soldiers conferred that honour on him.
- Lucius Valerius L. f. (P. n.) Poplicola, the father of Lucius Valerius Poplicola, the consular tribune.
- Lucius Valerius L. f. L. n. Poplicola, consular tribune in 394, 389, 387, 383, and 380 BC, possibly the same Lucius Valerius who was magister equitum to Marcus Furius Camillus in 390 BC, although that was probably his cousin, Lucius Valerius Potitus.
- Publius Valerius L. f. L. n. Poplicola, father of the consul of 352 BC.
- Marcus Valerius L. f. L. n. Poplicola, served as magister equitum in 358 BC, under the dictator Gaius Sulpicius Peticus. He was consul in 355, and again 353, serving alongside Peticus on both occasions.
- Publius Valerius P. f. L. n. Poplicola, consul in 352 BC; as praetor in 350 he commanded the reserves during the war against the Gauls. He was appointed dictator in 344, in order to hold a religious festival in response to dreadful omens. He is probably the same man who was nominated magister equitum by the dictator Marcus Papirius Crassus in 332.

=== Valerii Potiti ===
- Marcus Valerius Vol. f. Volusus, the brother of Poplicola, was one of the Roman commanders against Lars Porsenna in 508 BC. As consul in 505 BC, he and his colleague triumphed over the Sabines. He was one of the ambassadors to the Latin League in 501, and fell at the Battle of Lake Regillus, in 499.
- Lucius Valerius M. f. Vol. n. Potitus, one of the quaestors who prosecuted Spurius Cassius Vecellinus in 485 BC. He was consul in 483 and 470 BC, and fought against the Aequi during his second consulship. He was praefectus urbi in 464.
- Volesus Valerius Potitus, the grandfather of Gaius Valerius Potitus Volusus, consular tribune three times from 415 to 404 BC, according to the Fasti Capitolini. Münzer suggests that his praenomen should be Publius.
- Publius Valerius Potitus, the grandfather of Lucius Valerius Potitus, consular tribune five times from 414 to 398 BC, may be the same person as Volesus Valerius Potitus.
- Lucius Valerius Vol. f. Potitus, (Note: The Capitoline Fasti give Gaius' filiation as L. f. Vol. n., and Lucius' as L. f. P. n., but Münzer suggests that "Volesus" is a mistake for "Publius", in which case Gaius and Lucius would probably be brothers.) the father of Gaius Valerius Potitus Volusus, and perhaps also of his contemporary, Lucius Valerius Potitus.
- Lucius Valerius P. f. Potitus, the father of Lucius Valerius Potitus, twice consul and five times consular tribune, and perhaps also of Gaius Valerius Potitus Volusus.
- Gaius Valerius L. f. Vol. n. Potitus Volusus, consular tribune in 415, 407, and 404 BC, and consul in 410. As consul, he opposed the agrarian law of Marcus Maenius, and recovered the Arx Carventana from the Volsci, in consequence of which he was granted an ovation.
- Lucius Valerius L. f. P. n. Potitus, consular tribune in 414, 406, 403, 401, and 398 BC, and consul in 393 and 392; triumphed over the Aequi. Interrex for the purpose of holding the comitia in 392, and magister equitum under the dictator Marcus Furius Camillus in 390, the year in which Rome was taken by the Gauls.
- Publius Valerius L. f. L. n. Potitus Poplicola, consular tribune in 386, 384, 380, 377, 370, and 367 BC.
- Gaius Valerius (C. f. L. n.) Potitus, consular tribune in 370 BC.
- Gaius Valerius L. f. L. n. Potitus Flaccus, consul in 331 BC. He is probably the progenitor of the Valerii Flacci.
- Lucius Valerius (L. f. L. n.) Potitus, magister equitum in 331 BC.

=== Valerii Maximi ===
- Manius Valerius Vol. f. Volusus Maximus, dictator in 494 BC, he promised to alleviate the conditions of the debtors if the people would serve in the war against the Sabines and the Aequi. After triumphing over the enemy, Valerius was prevented from fulfilling his promise, and resigned the dictatorship, but was honoured by the people.
- Marcus Valerius M'. f. Vol. n. Maximus Lactuca, quaestor in 458 BC, prosecuted the accusers of Caeso Quinctius. As consul in 456 BC, he opposed the plan of Lucius Icilius, one of the tribunes of the plebs, to assign the Aventine Hill to the commons.
- Marcus Valerius M. f. M'. n. Lactucinus Maximus, consul suffectus in 437 BC.
- Marcus Valerius M. f. M. n. Lactucinus Maximus, consular tribune in 398 and 395 BC.
- Marcus Valerius M. f. M. n. Maximus Corvus, afterward surnamed Calenus, was consul in 348, 346, 343, 335, 300, and 299, dictator in 342 and 301, and interrex in 332 and 320 BC; triumphed over the Volsci in 346, the Samnites in 343, Cales in 335, and the Etruscans in 301. He was elected consul at twenty-three, and lived to the age of one hundred, filling the curule chair twenty-one times.
- Marcus Valerius M. f. Maximus, father of the consul of 312 BC.
- Marcus Valerius M. f. M. n. Maximus, consul in 312 and 289 BC, triumphed over the Samnites. He was censor in 307, and extended or improved the roads through the demesne lands.
- Marcus Valerius Maximus Potitus, consul in 286 BC. He was occupied by the agitation attending the Hortensian laws.
- Marcus (or Publius?) Valerius Maximus, one of the most important Roman scholars and antiquarians, and compiler of historical anecdotes, flourished during the early part of the first century. (Note: John Briscoe says "it is unlikely in the extreme" that Valerius Maximus belonged to the patrician Valerii, and suggests he descended from the plebeian Valerii Tapones or Triarii.)

=== Valerii Laevini ===
- Manius Valerius Laevinus, said to have numbered among a group of former military tribunes who were burned alive near the Circus Maximus in 485 BC, by the tribune of the plebs Publius Mucius Scaevola, allegedly for having conspired with Spurius Cassius Vecellinus.
- Publius Valerius Laevinus, consul in 280 BC, during the war with Pyrrhus. Although defeated by Pyrrhus, he escaped with much of his army intact, defended Capua, and successfully harried the Epirote army.
- Publius Valerius P. f. Laevinus, father of Marcus Valerius Laevinus, consul in 220 and 210 BC.
- Marcus Valerius P. f. P. n. Laevinus, elected consul in 220 BC, but probably resigned together with his colleague due to a fault in the elections. He was praetor peregrinus in 215, and afterward propraetor for several years, and consul for the second time in 210. He led a number of successful campaigns against Hannibal's allies during the Second Punic War, recovering much territory.
- Marcus Valerius M. f. P. n. Laevinus, son of Marcus Valerius Laevinus, consul in 220 and 210 BC. Together with his brother, Publius, he staged funeral games to commemorate the death of their father in 200. Might be the same person as Marcus Valerius Laevinus, praetor in 182 BC.
- Publius Valerius M. f. P. n. Laevinus, along with his brother Marcus, staged funeral games in 200 BC to commemorate the death of their father, Marcus Valerius Laevinus, consul in 220 and 210 BC.
- Marcus Valerius Laevinus, praetor peregrinus in 182 BC.
- Gaius Valerius M. f. P. n. Laevinus, half-brother of Marcus Fulvius Nobilior, consul in 189 BC, whom he accompanied to Greece. He was praetor in 179, with Sardinia as his province. Consul suffectus in 176 BC, he fought against the Ligures, and received a triumph the following year. He afterward served on ambassadorial missions to Greece and Egypt.
- Publius Valerius C. f. M. n. Laevinus, praetor in 177 BC, was assigned a portion of Cisalpine Gaul.

=== Valerii Flacci ===
- Lucius Valerius Flaccus, magister equitum under the dictator Marcus Aemilius Papus, 321 BC.
- Marcus Valerius L. f. Flaccus, father of Lucius Valerius Flaccus, the consul of 261 BC.
- Lucius Valerius M. f. L. n. Flaccus, consul in 261 BC, during the First Punic War. He fought against the Carthaginians in Sicily, but made little progress.
- Publius Valerius L. f. M. n. Flaccus, consul in 227 BC. During his year of office, the number of praetors was increased from two to four. In 219, he was one of the ambassadors sent to the Carthaginians to threaten war in response to the attack on Saguntum. He held several important commands during the early years of the Second Punic War.
- Lucius Valerius P. f. L. n. Flaccus, as a military tribune in 212 BC, led a daring attack on the camp of the Carthaginian general Hanno near Beneventum. He was consul in 195, and won important victories over the Gauls in that and the following year. In 184 he became princeps senatus, and served as censor with Cato the Elder.
- Gaius Valerius P. f. L. n. Flaccus, a young man of poor character, was named Flamen Dialis by the Pontifex Maximus in 209 BC, and to general astonishment proved himself worthy of the responsibility. He was curule aedile in 199, but as Flamen Dialis he could not take the oath of office. His brother, Lucius, took the oath for him. He was praetor peregrinus in 183, and in that capacity, introduced a Gallic embassy to the Senate.
- Lucius Valerius L. f. P. n. Flaccus, consul in 152 BC, died during his year of office.
- Lucius Valerius L. f. L. n. Flaccus, Flamen Martialis, and consul in 131 BC. His colleague, Publius Licinius Crassus, was also Pontifex Maximus, and forbade Flaccus from taking the conduct of the war against Aristonicus, imposing a fine for Flaccus' attempted desertion of his religious office. Although compelled to remain at Rome, the fine was remitted by public vote.
- Lucius Valerius L. f. L. n. Flaccus, consul in 100 BC, with Gaius Marius, acted to quell the unrest caused by Saturninus and Glaucia. He was censor in 97, and princeps senatus by 86; in 82 he proposed the lex Valeria appointing Sulla dictator, and in turn was nominated magister equitum, holding the post until Sulla's resignation in 79. He was Flamen Martialis before 69.
- Gaius Valerius C. f. L. n. Flaccus, consul in 93 BC, and afterwards proconsul of Hispania Citerior, where he put down a revolt by the Celtiberi. Later he held a command in Gallia Narbonensis, probably also as proconsul, and celebrated a triumph for his victories in 81.
- Lucius Valerius C. f. L. n. Flaccus, as curule aedile in 99 BC, was accused by Decianus, one of the tribunes of the plebs. In 86, he was appointed consul suffectus in the place of Gaius Marius, who died shortly after entering his seventh consulship. Sent against Mithridates in the east, Flaccus was betrayed and murdered by Gaius Flavius Fimbria.
- Lucius Valerius L. f. L. n. Flaccus (son of Lucius Valerius Flaccus), praetor in 63 BC, he assisted his colleague, Gaius Pomptinus, in arresting the envoys of the Allobroges. He then served as propraetor in Asia, and was accused of extortion in 59. Despite his probable guilt, he was successfully defended by Cicero in his oration, Pro Flacco.
- Gaius Valerius L. f. Flaccus, a friend of Appius Claudius Pulcher. Cicero met him in Cilicia in 51 BC.
- Lucius Valerius L. f. L. n. Flaccus, son of the praetor defended by Cicero, was brought before the court as an appeal to the judges' pity. During the Civil War, he fought on the side of Pompeius, and was killed at Dyrrachium in 48 BC.
- Lucius Valerius (L. f. L. n.) Flaccus, Flamen Martialis in the time of Cicero, whose brother, Quintus, heard him give an account of a marvelous occurrence. Joseph Hilarius Eckhel believed that he was the same Flaccus whom Cicero defended, which seems likely, as he would have inherited the priesthood from his father, the consul of 100 BC.
- Publius (Valerius) Flaccus, successfully accused Marcus Papirius Carbo of extortion while as governor of Sicily.
- Gaius Valerius Flaccus, a Latin poet, active during the latter half of the first century AD. He was a friend of Martial. His only surviving work is his Argonautica, an unfinished poem about the voyage of the Argonauts in eight books.
- Lucius Valerius Flaccus, consul suffectus in AD 128, serving from the Kalends of July to the Kalends of September.

=== Valerii Messallae ===
- Manius Valerius M. f. M. n. Corvinus Messalla, consul in 263 BC, the second year of the First Punic War. Campaigning in Sicily, he and his colleague, Manius Otacilius Crassus, concluded a treaty with Hiero. He was granted a triumph, and earned the cognomen Messalla by relieving Messana from naval blockade. He was censor in 252.
- Marcus Valerius M'. f. M. n. Maximus Messala, consul in 226 BC, organized the allies in preparation for an anticipated invasion of Italy by the Gauls.
- Marcus Valerius M. f. M'. Messalla, prefect of the fleet in Sicily in 210 BC, the ninth year of the Second Punic War, carried out a successful raid on the countryside around Utica. He was nominated dictator, but his appointment was annulled. Messalla was praetor peregrinus in 194, and consul in 188 BC.
- Marcus Valerius M. f. M. n. Messalla, consul in 161 BC, the year in which the senate prohibited the residence of Greek rhetoricians at Rome. Although previously degraded by the censors, Messalla himself held the censorship in 154.
- Manius Valerius M. f. M. n. Messalla, the great-grandfather of Marcus Valerius Messalla Niger, consul in 61 BC.
- Marcus Valerius M'. f. M. n. Messalla, grandfather of Marcus Valerius Messalla Niger.
- Manius Valerius M' f. M. n. Messalla, uncle of Marcus Valerius Messalla Niger, and father-in-law of Sulla.
- Marcus Valerius M'. f. M'. n. Messalla, father of Marcus Valerius Messalla Niger. Either he or his brother, Manius, was a legate of the consul Publius Rutilius Lupus in 90 BC, toward the beginning of the Social War.
- Valeria M'. f. M. n., the fifth and last wife of Sulla, and mother of his daughter Cornelia Postuma.
- Marcus Valerius M. f. M'. n. Messalla Niger, consul in 61 BC, was one of the prosecutors of Publius Clodius Pulcher. He was censor in 55. Cicero describes Valerius as a capable orator. He married Hortensia, sister of the orator Quintus Hortensius.
- Marcus Valerius M. f. M. n. Messalla Rufus, consul in 53 BC. He was supported by Cicero, and opposed by Pompeius and the supporters of Publius Clodius Pulcher. In 47, he served under Caesar during the Civil War.
- Marcus Valerius M. f. M. n. Messalla Corvinus, a partisan of Gaius Cassius Longinus, he was proscribed by the triumvirs, but accepted terms from Marcus Antonius after the death of Brutus and Cassius. He later went over to Octavian, and was appointed consul suffectus in place of Antonius in 31 BC. He distinguished himself at the Battle of Actium, and triumphed over the Aquitani in 27.
- Marcus Valerius M. f. M. n. Messalla, consul suffectus in 32 BC.
- Potitus Valerius M. f. Messalla, consul suffectus from the Kalends of October in 29 BC. He was subsequently proconsul of Asia, and later governor of Syria.
- Marcus Valerius Messalla M. f. M. n. Barbatus, surnamed Appianus, consul in 12 BC, died during his year of office. He was probably the grandfather of the empress Messalina.
- Marcus Valerius M. f. M. n. Messallinus, consul in 3 BC.
- Lucius Valerius Potiti f. M. n. Messalla Volesus, consul in AD 5. Subsequently, while proconsul of Asia, he behaved with extreme cruelty, for which he was condemned by the emperor and the Senate.
- Marcus Valerius M. f. M. n. Messalla Barbatus, consul in AD 20, had proposed that the oath of loyalty given by the senate to the emperor be repeated annually. He was the first husband of Domitia Lepida.
- Valeria M. f. M. n. Messalina, third wife of the emperor Claudius. She was infamous for her intrigues, which brought about the downfall of many members of the imperial aristocracy. At last the emperor was persuaded that her open betrayal of his trust foreboded a plot against him, and she was put to death.
- Marcus Valerius M. f. M. n. Messalla Corvinus, consul in AD 58. Although a great-grandson of Corvinus, the consul of 31 BC, his family fortune had since been lost, and so he was granted an allowance from the treasury.
- Lucius Valerius (L. f.) Messalla Thrasea Priscus, a man of great wisdom, was consul in AD 196, and slain by Caracalla in 212. Perhaps the progenitor of the third century consular family of the Valerii, he may in fact have been a son of Lucius Vipstanus Poplicola Messalla, who discarded his original nomen in order to emphasize his descent from the Valerii through a female line.
- Lucius Valerius (L. f. L. n.) Messalla, possibly surnamed Apollinaris, consul in AD 214, and perhaps proconsul of Africa about 236 to 238.
- Lucius Valerius (L. f. L. n.) Maximus Acilius Priscillianus, consul in AD 233, and afterward curator of the banks of the Tiber. He was involved in the senatorial revolt against the emperor Maximinus Thrax in 238. About 255 he was praefectus urbi, and in 256 he was consul for the second time.
- Lucius Valerius L. f. (L. n.) Poplicola Balbinus Maximus, consul in AD 253. He held a number of minor offices, but does not seem to have governed a province.
- (Lucius Valerius L. f. L. n.) Messalla, consul in AD 280.
- Valerius Maximus signo Basilius, praefectus urbi of Rome from AD 319 to 323.
- Saint Melania the Elder ca. 350-417, married to Valerius Maximus signo Basilius
- Valerius Maximus, consul in AD 327 and praetorian prefect under the emperor Constantine, and probably son of Valerius Maximus signo Basilius.
- Valerius Publicola, (c. 350 AD) son of Melania the Elder and Valerius Maximus signo Basilius, and father of Melania the Younger
- Saint Melania the Younger 383-439

=== Valerii Faltones ===
- Publius Valerius, grandfather of Quintus and Publius Valerius Falto, the consuls of 239 and 238 BC.
- Quintus Valerius P. f. (Falto), father of the consuls Quintus and Publius Valerius Falto.
- Quintus Valerius Q. f. P. n. Falto, consul in 239 BC; as the first praetor peregrinus in 242, commanded the Roman fleet at the Battle of the Aegates, and triumphed over the Carthaginians.
- Publius Valerius Q. f. P. n. Falto, consul in 238 BC, he suffered a defeat at the hands of the Boii and Ligures, but counterattacked and routed them. He was refused a triumph in consequence of his earlier defeat, and because his counterattack before reinforcements could arrive was considered rash.
- Marcus Valerius Falto, one of the senatorial envoys sent to Attalus I of Pergamon in 205 BC. As curule aedile in 203, he and his colleague secured a large supply of Spanish grain, which they were able to sell to the poor for one sestertius per bushel. He was praetor in 201, with Bruttium as his province.

=== Valerii Tappones ===
- Lucius Valerius Tappo, tribune of the plebs in 195 BC, opposed the repeal of the Lex Oppia with Cato the Censor. He was praetor in 192, he obtained Sicily as his province. In 190 he was one of the triumvirs for settling new colonists at Placentia and Cremona.
- Gaius Valerius Tappo, tribune of the plebs in 188 BC, proposed that the franchise be extended to the Formiani, Fundani, and Arpinates.

=== Valerii Triarii ===
- Lucius Valerius Triarius, perhaps the same person as Gaius Valerius Triarius, the legate of Lucullus.
- Gaius Valerius Triarius, praetor circa 78 BC, and propraetor in Sardinia in 77, subsequently served as a legate under Lucullus in the war against Mithridates. In 68 and 67, he put Mithridates on the defensive, but overextended himself, and was attacked at a disadvantage. His forces were utterly defeated with great loss of life, and Triarius was only saved by the arrival of Lucullus.
- Publius Valerius C. f. Triarius, in 54 BC accused Marcus Aemilius Scaurus, first of repetundae (extortion) and then of ambitus (bribery). Cicero defended Scaurus on both occasions.
- Gaius Valerius (C. f.) Triarius, a friend of Cicero, and a supporter of Pompeius during the Civil War. At the Battle of Pharsalus in 48 BC, Pompeius, acting on Triarius' advice, ordered his troops to stand fast against Caesar's charge. Triarius apparently died during the war, leaving Cicero as the guardian of his children.
- Valeria (C. f.) Paula, sister of Cicero's friend Gaius Valerius Triarius, was divorced in 50 BC, and subsequently married Decimus Junius Brutus Albinus.

=== Valerii Catulli ===
- Gaius Valerius Catullus, the poet, flourished during the middle of the first century BC.
- Lucius Valerius Catullus, a triumvir monetalis in the time of Augustus.
- Lucius Valerius L. f. Catullus, was adopted by Sextus Tedius, (Note: Or Teidius; both spellings are found for Valerius.) becoming Sextus Tedius Valerius Catullus. He was consul suffectus in AD 31, serving from the seventh day before the Ides of May to the Kalends of July.
- Lucius Valerius Catullus Messalinus, consul in AD 73, together with the future emperor Domitian. He was governor of Crete and Cyrenaica, but recalled due to his mistreatment of the Libyan Jews. He was a notorious delator during the reign of Domitian, and consul suffectus from the kalends of March to the kalends of May in 85.

=== Valerii Asiatici ===
- Decimus Valerius Asiaticus, consul suffectus in AD 35, serving from the kalends of July. Suspected of Caligula's murder, he avoided the retribution of the praetorian guard by boldly proclaiming that he wished he had slain the emperor. He was consul ordinarius in 46, serving until the kalends of March. The following year he fell victim to the intrigues of the empress Messalina.
- Decimus Valerius D. f. Asiaticus, governor of Gallia Belgica during the reign of Nero. He married a daughter of Vitellius, and was designated consul for AD 70 under Vespasian, but died before taking office.
- Marcus Lollius Paullinus Decimus Valerius D. f. D. n. Asiaticus Saturninus, grandson of the emperor Vitellius, was consul suffectus in AD 94, serving from the kalends of May to the kalends of August. He was proconsul of Asia from 108 to 109, and praefectus urbi from 124 to 134, holding the consulship for a second time in AD 125.
- Decimus Valerius M. f. D. n. Taurus Catullus Messallinus Asiaticus, was a member of the Arval Brethren.
- Quintus Valerius Asiaticus, mentioned in a libationary inscription from Liguria.

=== Others ===
- Valerius of Ostia, an architect, who designed the covered theatre built for the games of Libo (probably the Lucius Scribonius Libo who, while curule aedile in 193 BC, celebrated the Megalesia).
- Marcus Valerius M. f. Artema, an architect, mentioned in an extant inscription.
- Decimus Valerius L. f., a vascularius, or maker of bronze vases, from Tusculum.
- Valerius Aedituus, a Roman poet, who probably lived about 100 BC. Two epigrams quoted in the Noctes Atticae of Aulus Gellius are attributed to him.
- Gaius Valerius Caburus, a Gaul who was granted Roman citizenship by Gaius Valerius Flaccus, the consul of 93 BC. He had two sons, Gaius Valerius Procillus, who plays a role in Book 1 of Caesar's Gallic Wars, and Gaius Valerius Domnotaurus, whose death in the war is recorded in Book 7.
- Quintus Valerius Soranus, an orator, scholar, and poet, much admired by Cicero; he had been tribune of the plebs, but the year is uncertain. He was put to death in 82 BC, ostensibly for revealing the sacred name of Rome, but more probably because he was proscribed by Sulla as a partisan of Marius.
- Valerius Nepos, one of Milo's accusers.
- Lucius Valerius Antias, sent with five ships by Publius Valerius Flaccus in 215 BC, during the Second Punic War, to convey the Carthaginian ambassadors to Rome.
- Valerius Antias, the annalist, lived during the first century BC.
- Publius Valerius Cato, a scholar and poet who lived during the first century BC.
- Quintus Valerius Orca, praetor in 57 BC, and subsequently proconsul of Africa. He served under Caesar during the Civil War.
- Lucius Valerius Praeconinus, a legate under Caesar's command, who was defeated and slain by the Aquitani in 57 BC.
- Gaius Valerius C. f. Procillus, a Gallic chief who became one of the friends and allies of Caesar during his conquest of Gaul. He served as Caesar's interpreter and emissary, and was rescued by Caesar after being captured by Ariovistus, to whom he had been dispatched as an ambassador.
- Valerius Valentinus, accused Gaius Cosconius, probably of extortion in his province. Cosconius was apparently guilty, but his acquittal was secured when a bawdy poem by Valentinus was read in court.
- Lucius Valerius Acisculus, triumvir monetalis in 45 BC.
- Valerius Ligur, praetorian prefect in the time of Augustus.
- Valerius Largus, earned the ire of Augustus by accusing Gaius Cornelius Gallus.
- Valerius Gratus, as procurator of Judaea from AD 15 to 27, fought to deliver the country from robbers, assisted the proconsul Quinctilius Varus in putting down a revolt, and appointed several successive high priests, of whom the last was Caiaphas. He was followed by Pontius Pilate.
- Valerius Naso, a former praetor, who was appointed to oversee the construction of a temple in honour of Tiberius at Smyrna in AD 26.
- Valerius Capito, had been banished by Agrippina the Younger, but after her death, Nero recalled him.
- Valerius Ponticus, banished in AD 61.
- Valerius Fabianus, a man of senatorial rank, was degraded in AD 62 by the lex Cornelia Testamentaria, after forging a will purportedly belonging to a wealthy relative, Domitius Balbus, in order to claim the latter's fortune.
- Marcus Valerius Probus, a grammarian who flourished from the time of Nero to the end of the first century. He was quite learned, but published little of importance, and seldom took pupils.
- Valerius Marinus, announced as consul designate by Galba in AD 69, he never took office, as Vitellius succeeded to the empire first.
- Marcus Valerius Paulinus, a friend and early ally of Vespasian, who had been appointed procurator of Gallia Narbonensis in AD 69. He served in the Jewish War, and is said to have been consul in AD 101, early in the reign of Trajan.
- Gaius Calpetanus Rantius Quirinalis Valerius Festus, a partisan of Vespasian, whom he secretly served as legate in Africa. After Vespasian's accession, Festus was named consul suffectus in AD 71, serving from the kalends of May to the kalends of July.
- Valerius Theon, a sophist, and the author of a commentary on Andocides. Some scholars suppose him to be the same person as the sophist Aelius Theon.
- Publius Valerius Patruinus, consul suffectus from the Kalends of July to the Kalends of September in AD 82.
- Publius Valerius Marinus, consul suffectus from the Kalends of May to the Kalends of September in AD 91.
- Quintus Valerius Vegetus, consul suffectus from the Kalends of September to the end of the year in AD 91.
- Valerius Licinianus, an advocate, and former praetor, who was accused of having committed incest with Cornelia, chief of the Vestal Virgins. He confessed in hopes of being spared by Domitian, who banished him. Under Nerva he was permitted to live in Sicily, where he taught rhetoric.
- Quintus Fabius Barbarus Valerius Magnus Julianus, consul suffectus from the Kalends of July to the Kalends of September in AD 99.
- Valeria of Milan, a first- or second-century Christian martyr.
- Marcus Valerius Martialis, otherwise known as "Martial", a poet who flourished under the reigns of Domitian, Nerva, and Trajan, and was famous for his epigrams.
- Gaius Valerius Anemestione C. Ius, an anaglyptarius, or metalworker, so described in a Cordovan inscription.
- Gaius Valerius Paullinus, consul suffectus in AD 107, serving from the Kalends of September to the end of the year.
- Lucius Mummius Niger Quintus Valerius Vegetus, consul suffectus in AD 112, serving from the Kalends of April to the Kalends of July.
- Gaius Valerius Severus, governor of Achaea from AD 117 to 118, then of Lycia and Pamphylia until 122. In 124, he was consul suffectus from the Kalends of September to the end of the year.
- [...]catus Publius Valerius Priscus, consul circa AD 120 or 121.
- Lucius Valerius Propinquus Pomponius Granius Grattius (Cerealis?) Geminius Restitutus, consul suffectus in AD 126, from the Kalends of March to the Kalends of July. He was governor of Germania Inferior in the early 130s, and of Asia from 140 to 141.
- Valerius Pollio, a philosopher from Alexandria, who lived in the time of Hadrian. He was the father of Valerius Pollio Diodorus.
- Valerius Pollio Diodorus, the son of Valerius Pollio, was a philosopher who lived in the age of Hadrian.
- Valerius Urbicus, consul in an uncertain year before AD 138.
- Marcus Valerius Junianus, consul suffectus in AD 143.
- Gaius Valerius L. f. Florinus, the brother of Proculus, was a military tribune in the Legio VII Claudia, according to a second-century inscription from Praeneste.
- Lucius Valerius L. f. Proculus, the brother of Florinus, was praefectus annonae from AD 142 to 144, and prefect of Egypt from 144 to 147.
- Sextus Quinctilius Valerius Maximus, consul in AD 151.
- Marcus Valerius Homullus, consul in AD 152, was a friend of Antoninus Pius, and humorously admonished the emperor on various occasions.
- Marcus Valerius Etruscus, legate of the third legion, was probably consul suffectus from the Kalends of July to the Kalends of September in AD 154.
- Marcus Valerius Bradua, the father of Marcus Valerius Bradua Mauricus, the consul of AD 191.
- Marcus Asinius Rufinus Valerius Verus Sabinianus, consul in an uncertain year between AD 183 and 185.
- Marcus Valerius Maximianus, consul suffectus in AD 185.
- Valerius Senecio, consul suffectus in AD 186.
- Marcus Valerius M. f. Bradua Mauricus, consul in AD 191.
- Gaius Valerius Pudens, consul suffectus in AD 193 or 194. He had been governor of Pannonia Inferior, and was governor of Britain in the early third century. He was proconsul of Africa circa 211.
- Valerius Bassianus, put to death by Commodus.
- Ofilius Valerius Macedo, consul suffectus in an uncertain year, before AD 198.
- Valerius Catulinus, appointed by Didius Julianus to succeed Septimius Severus as governor of Illyricum, when Severus refused to acknowledge his title. However, Catulinus was slain by Severus' forces.
- Marcus Valerius Senecio, consul suffectus in an uncertain year, between AD 211 and 217.
- Publius Valerius Eutychianus Comazon, an actor and dancer who became a friend and confidant of Elagabalus after having taken part in the conspiracy against Macrinus. He was appointed praetorian prefect, then consul in AD 220, and served three times as praefectus urbi, twice under Elagabalus, and again under Alexander Severus.
- Quintus (or Claudius?) Valerius Rufrius Justus, consul suffectus in an uncertain year, between AD 220 and 230.
- Valerius Marcellinus, a historian, and biographer of the emperors, cited by Julius Capitolinus.
- Julius Valerius Alexander Polemius, a scholar of the late third and early fourth century, who translated the life of Alexander the Great, of the Pseudo-Callisthenes, into Latin.
- Valerius of Saragossa, Bishop of Caesaraugusta in Hispania Tarraconensis from AD 290 to 315.
- Valerius Proculus, consul in AD 325.
- Aurelius Valerius Tullianus Symmachus, consul in AD 330.
- Lucius Aradius Valerius Proculus, also known as Populonius, consul in AD 340, and praefectus urbi from 337 to 338, and from 351 to 352.
- Valerius of Trèves, a fourth-century bishop of Augusta Treverorum.
- Lucius Valerius Septimius Bassus, praefectus urbi under Gratian, Valentinian II, and Theodosius I.
- Valerius II, Bishop of Zaragoza, circa 380
- Valerius Adelphius Bassus, consularis of Venetia and Histria under Valentinian II, Theodosius I and Arcadius, and perhaps the son of Lucius Valerius Septimius Bassus.
- Flavius Valerius, consul in AD 432.
- Valerius Faltonius Adelphius, consul in AD 451, perhaps the son of Valerius Adelphius Bassus.
- Flavius Valerius, consul in AD 521.

=== Imperial Valerii ===
- Gaius Aurelius Valerius Diocletianus, emperor from AD 284 to 305.
- Marcus Aurelius Valerius Maximianus 'Herculius', emperor from AD 286 to 305, 306 to 308, and 310.
- Galerius Valerius Maximianus, better known as Galerius, emperor from AD 305 to 311.
- Galeria Valeria, the daughter of Diocletian, and second wife of Galerius.
- Galerius Valerius Maximinus Daza, emperor from AD 310 to 313.
- Marcus (or Gaius) Flavius Valerius Constantius, later surnamed "Chlorus", emperor from AD 305 to 306.
- Flavius Valerius Severus, emperor from AD 306 to 307.
- Marcus Aurelius Valerius Maxentius, emperor from AD 306 to 312.
- Valeria Maximilla, the daughter of Galerius and wife of Maxentius.
- Flavius Valerius Constantinus, better known as Constantine the Great, emperor from AD 306 to 337.
- Valerius Licinianus Licinius, emperor from AD 308 to 324.
- Valerius Romulus, the son of Maxentius and Valeria Maximilla, consul in AD 308 and 309.
- Julius Valerius Majorianus, emperor from AD 457 to 461.

== See also ==
- List of Roman gentes

== Bibliography ==
- Polybius, Historiae (The Histories).
- Marcus Tullius Cicero, Brutus, De Divinatione, De Haruspicum Responsis, De Lege Agraria contra Rullum, De Legibus, De Oratore, De Republica, De Senectute, Epistulae ad Atticum, Epistulae ad Familiares, Epistulae ad Quintum Fratrem, In Pisonem, Philippicae, Post Reditum in Senatu, Pro Balbo, Pro Flacco, Pro Lege Manilia, Pro Scauro, Pro Sexto Roscio Amerino, Pro Quinto Roscio Comoedo, Pro Sulla.
- Gaius Julius Caesar, Commentarii de Bello Civili (Commentaries on the Civil War), Commentarii de Bello Gallico (Commentaries on the Gallic War), De Bello Africo (On the African War, attributed).
- Gaius Sallustius Crispus (Sallust), Bellum Catilinae (The Conspiracy of Catiline).
- Diodorus Siculus, Bibliotheca Historica (Library of History).
- Marcus Terentius Varro, De Lingua Latina (On the Latin Language), Rerum Rusticarum (Rural Matters).
- Cornelius Nepos, De Viris Illustribus (On the Lives of Famous Men).
- Quintus Horatius Flaccus (Horace), Satirae (Satires).
- Albius Tibullus, Elegiae (Elegies).
- Dionysius of Halicarnassus, Romaike Archaiologia (Roman Antiquities).
- Titus Livius (Livy), History of Rome.
- Strabo, Geographica.
- Marcus Velleius Paterculus, Compendium of Roman History.
- Valerius Maximus, Factorum ac Dictorum Memorabilium (Memorable Facts and Sayings).
- Lucius Annaeus Seneca (Seneca the Younger), Apocolocyntosis Divi Claudii (The Gourdification of the Divine Claudius), De Brevitate Vitae (On the Brevity of Life), De Ira (On Anger), Epistulae Morales ad Lucilium (Moral Letters to Lucilius), De Constantia Sapientis (On the Firmness of the Wise).
- Quintus Asconius Pedianus, Commentarius in Oratio Ciceronis In Pisonem (Commentary on Cicero's Oration In Pisonem), Commentarius in Oratio Ciceronis Pro Milone (Commentary on Cicero's Oration Pro Milone), Commentarius in Oratio Ciceronis Pro Scauro (Commentary on Cicero's Oration Pro Scauro).
- Scholia Gronoviana, In Ciceronis Pro Roscio Amerino (Commentary on Cicero’s Oration Pro Roscio Amerino).
- Gaius Plinius Secundus (Pliny the Elder), Historia Naturalis (Natural History).
- Gaius Plinius Caecilius Secundus (Pliny the Younger), Epistulae (Letters).
- Flavius Josephus, Antiquitates Judaïcae (Antiquities of the Jews), Bellum Judaïcum (The Jewish War).
- Sextus Julius Frontinus, Strategemata (Stratagems).
- Marcus Valerius Martialis (Martial), Epigrammata (Epigrams).
- Decimus Junius Juvenalis, Satirae (Satires).
- Publius Cornelius Tacitus, Annales, Historiae, Dialogus de Oratoribus (Dialogue on Oratory).
- Plutarchus, Lives of the Noble Greeks and Romans.
- Gaius Suetonius Tranquillus, De Vita Caesarum (Lives of the Caesars, or The Twelve Caesars), De Claris Rhetoribus (On the Eminent Orators), De Illustribus Grammaticis (On the Illustrious Grammarians).
- Lucius Annaeus Florus, Epitome de T. Livio Bellorum Omnium Annorum DCC (Epitome of Livy: All the Wars of Seven Hundred Years).
- Marcus Junianus Justinus Frontinus (Justin), Epitome de Cn. Pompeio Trogo Historiarum Philippicarum et Totius Mundi Originum et Terrae Situs (Epitome of Trogus' Philippic History and Origin of the Whole World and all of its Lands).
- Appianus Alexandrinus (Appian), Bella Mithridatica (The Mithridatic Wars), Bella Illyrica (The Illyrian Wars), Bellum Civile (The Civil War), Bellum Samniticum (History of the Samnite War), Hispanica (The Spanish Wars).
- Aulus Gellius, Noctes Atticae (Attic Nights).
- Julius Paulus, Receptarum Sententiarum, or Pauli Sententiae (Received Judgments, or the Judgments of Paulus).
- Lucius Cassius Dio Cocceianus (Cassius Dio), Roman History.
- Herodianus, History of the Empire from the Death of Marcus.
- Censorinus, De Die Natali.
- Lucius Caecilius Firmianus Lactantius, De Mortibus Persecutorum (On the Deaths of the Persecutors).
- Eusebius of Caesarea, Historia Ecclesiastica, Vita Constantini (The Life of Constantine).
- Aelius Lampridius, Aelius Spartianus, Flavius Vopiscus, Julius Capitolinus, Trebellius Pollio, and Vulcatius Gallicanus, Historia Augusta (Augustan History).
- Flavius Claudius Julianus (Julian), Orations.
- Festus, Breviarum Rerum Gestarum Populi Romani (Summary of the History of the Roman People).
- Libanius, Orations.
- Julius Obsequens, Liber de Prodigiis (The Book of Prodigies).
- Eutropius, Breviarium Historiae Romanae (Abridgement of the History of Rome).
- Sextus Aurelius Victor, De Caesaribus (On the Caesars), Epitome de Caesaribus (attributed), De Viris Illustribus (On Famous Men).
- Ammianus Marcellinus, Res Gestae.
- Claudius Claudianus (Claudian), De Bello Gothico (On the Gothic War).
- Paulus Orosius, Historiarum Adversum Paganos (History Against the Pagans).
- Eusebius Sophronius Hieronymus (St. Jerome), In Chronicon Eusebii (The Chronicon of Eusebius).
- Ambrosius Theodosius Macrobius, Saturnalia.
- Hydatius, Chronicon (The Chronicle).
- Gaius Sollius Modestus Apollinaris Sidonius, Panegyrici.
- Priscus, quoted in the Excerpta de Legationibus.
- Zosimus, Historia Nova (New History).
- Marcellinus, Annales, or Chronicon.
- Procopius Caesariensis, De Bello Vandalico (The Vandal War).
- Jordanes, Getica.
- Evagrius Scholasticus, Historia Ecclesiastica.
- Georgius Florentius Gregorius (Gregory of Tours), Historiarum (Histories).
- Scholia Bobiensia (Bobbio Scholiast), In Ciceronis De Aere Alieno Milonis (Commentary on Cicero’s Oration De Aere Alieno Milonis), In Ciceronis In Vatinium (Commentary on Cicero’s Oration In Vatinium), In Ciceronis Pro Flacco (Commentary on Cicero’s Oration Pro Flacco).
- Theophanes the Confessor, Chronicle.
- Suda.
- Joannes Zonaras, Epitome Historiarum (Epitome of History).
- Ludovico Antonio Muratori, Novus Thesaurus Veterum Inscriptionum (New Treasury of Ancient Inscriptions), Milan (1739-42).
- Pieter Burmann, Anthologia Latina (Latin Anthology), ed. Wernsdorf, (1759–1778).
- Joseph Hilarius Eckhel, Doctrina Numorum Veterum (The Study of Ancient Coins, 1792–1798).
- Karl Julius Sillig, Catalogus Artificium sive Architecti Statuarii Sculptores Pictores Caelatores et Scalptores Graecorum et Romanorum (Catalogue of Artists, with Greek and Roman Architects, Statuaries, Sculptors, Painters, Ornamenters, and Engravers), Libraria Arnoldia, Dresden and Leipzig (1827).
- Barthold Georg Niebuhr, The History of Rome, Julius Charles Hare and Connop Thirlwall, trans., John Smith, Cambridge (1828).
- Johann Caspar von Orelli, Inscriptionum Latinarum Selectarum Amplissima Collectio (An Extensive Collection of Select Latin Inscriptions), Orell Füssli, Zürich (1828).
- Desiré-Raoul Rochette, Lettre à M. Schorn, Firmin Didot Frères, Paris (1832).
- Dictionary of Greek and Roman Biography and Mythology, William Smith, ed., Little, Brown and Company, Boston (1849).
- Theodor Mommsen et alii, Corpus Inscriptionum Latinarum (The Body of Latin Inscriptions, abbreviated CIL), Berlin-Brandenburgische Akademie der Wissenschaften (1853–present).
- Dictionary of Greek and Roman Antiquities, William Smith, ed., Little, Brown, and Company, Boston (1859).
- René Cagnat et alii, L'Année épigraphique (The Year in Epigraphy, abbreviated AE), Presses Universitaires de France (1888–present).
- Friedrich Münzer, De Gente Valeria (The Gens Valeria), Erdmann Raabe, Opole (1891).
- George Davis Chase, "The Origin of Roman Praenomina", in Harvard Studies in Classical Philology, vol. VIII (1897).
- Paul von Rohden, Elimar Klebs, & Hermann Dessau, Prosopographia Imperii Romani (The Prosopography of the Roman Empire, abbreviated PIR), Berlin (1898).
- Friedrich Münzer, Römische Adelsparteien und Adelsfamilien (Roman Aristocratic Parties and Families), Stuttgart, 1920.
- T. Robert S. Broughton, The Magistrates of the Roman Republic, American Philological Association (1952).
- E. Mary Smallwood, Documents Illustrating the Principates of Nerva, Trajan, and Hadrian, Cambridge University Press (1966).
- Oxford Classical Dictionary, N. G. L. Hammond and H. H. Scullard, eds., Clarendon Press, Oxford (Second Edition, 1970).
- Chisholm, Hugh, ed. (1911). "Valerius, Publius" . Encyclopædia Britannica. Vol. 27 (11th ed.). Cambridge University Press. p. 859.
- A. H. M. Jones & J. R. Martindale, The Prosopography of the Later Roman Empire (abbreviated PLRE), Cambridge University Press (1971–1992).
- Guido Bastianini, "Lista dei prefetti d'Egitto dal 30^{a} al 299^{p}" (List of the Prefects of Egypt from 30 BC to AD 299), in Zeitschrift für Papyrologie und Epigraphik, vol. 17 (1975).
- Werner Eck, "Epigraphische Untersuchungen zu Konsuln und Senatoren des 1.–3. Jh. n. Chr." (Investigation of Consular and Senatorial Epigraphy from the First to the Third Century AD), in Zeitschrift für Papyrologie und Epigraphik, vol. 37 (1980).
- Paul A. Gallivan, "The Fasti for the Reign of Claudius", in Classical Quarterly, vol. 28, pp. 407–426 (1978); "The Fasti for A.D. 70–96", in Classical Quarterly, vol. 31, pp. 186–220 (1981).
- Olli Salomies, Adoptive and Polyonymous Nomenclature in the Roman Empire, Societas Scientiarum Fennica, Helsinki (1992).
- John C. Traupman, The New College Latin & English Dictionary, Bantam Books, New York (1995).
- Inge Mennen, Power and Status in the Roman Empire, AD 193–284, Brill (2011).
- Tim Cornell (editor), The Fragments of the Roman Historians, Oxford University Press, 2013.
- John Briscoe, Valerius Maximus, Facta Et Dicta Memorabilia, Book 8: Text, Introduction, and Commentary, Berlin/Boston, de Gruyter, 2019.
