= Lucius Valerius Claudius Acilius Priscillianus Maximus (consul 233) =

Roman senator and consul in 233 and 256

Lucius Valerius Claudius Acilius Priscillianus [Maximus] (fl. 3rd century) was a senator of the Roman Empire.

== Life ==
Valerius Maximus, a member of the third century gens Valeria, was possibly the son of Lucius Valerius Messalla by his wife Claudia Acilia Priscilliana, as his nomina and cognomina combined suggest. He began his career serving as the sevir equitum Romanorum at the annual review of the equites. His first political appointment was as the triumvir monetalis, followed by a posting as quaestor in some unknown province.

This was followed by his being appointed quaestor urbanus, after which he filled the office of praetor tutelaris (the official responsible for matters of guardianship). Then in 233, Valerius Maximus was made consul prior alongside Gnaeus Cornelius Paternus. For his proconsular command, Valerius Maximus was appointed curator alvi Tiberis riparum cloacarumque sacrae urbis (responsible for maintaining the sewers and the banks of the Tiber river within the city of Rome).

In 238, Valerius Maximus was one of the Italian nobility who was involved in the senatorial revolt against the emperor Maximinus Thrax. He perhaps had a role in the negotiations which saw Gordian I offered the imperial office, and was the comes augusti of one of the replacement emperors, Pupienus. During that year he was also one of the vigintivirs. This was followed by his appointment as curator Laurentium Lavinatium.

Apparently falling out of imperial favour during the reign of Philip the Arab, Valerius Maximus regained high political office during the reign of the emperor Valerian with his appointment as praefectus urbi of Rome in 255. This was followed in the following year with his second consulship, this time serving with Marcus Acilius Glabrio.

Valerius Maximus probably had a son, Lucius Valerius Poplicola Balbinus Maximus, who was consul in 253.

== Ancestry ==
Ancestors of Lucius Valerius Claudius Acilius Priscillianus Maximus

16. Lucius Vipstanus Messalla
8. Lucius Vipstanus Poplicola Messalla
4. Lucius Valerius Messalla Thrasea Priscus
18. Publius Helvidius Priscus
9. Helvidia Priscilla
19. Plautia Quinctilia
2. Lucius Valerius Messalla
10. Marcus Aquilius Coelius Apollinaris
5. Coelia Balbina
1. Lucius Valerius Claudius Acilius Priscillianus Maximus
12. Tiberius Claudius Cleobulus
6. Tiberius Claudius Cleobulus
26. (=28.) Manius Acilius Glabrio Gnaeus Cornelius Severus
13. Acilia
27. (=29.) ... Faustina
3. Claudia Acilia Priscilliana
28. (=26.) Manius Acilius Glabrio Gnaeus Cornelius Severus
14. Manius Acilius Glabrio
29. (=27.) ... Faustina
7. Acilia Frestana

== Sources ==
- Mennen, Inge, Power and Status in the Roman Empire, AD 193-284 (2011)

Political offices
Preceded by Lucius Virius Lupus Julianus, and Lucius Marius Maximus	Consul of the Roman Empire; 233 with Gnaeus Cornelius Paternus	Succeeded by Marcus Clodius Pupienus Maximus II, and Marcus Munatius Sulla Urbanus
Preceded by Publius Licinius Valerianus III, and Publius Licinius Gallienus II	Consul of the Roman Empire; 256 with Marcus Acilius Glabrio	Succeeded by Publius Licinius Valerianus IV, and Publius Licinius Gallienus III
