= Volesus (praenomen) =

Latin name

Volesus, Volusus, or Volero is a Latin praenomen, or personal name, which was occasionally used during the period of the Roman Republic, and briefly revived in imperial times. It gave rise to the patronymic gentes Valeria and Volusia. Although not attested from inscriptions, the feminine form would have been Volesa or Volusa. Unlike the more common praenomina, which were usually abbreviated, this name was regularly spelled out, but is also found abbreviated Vol.

The praenomen Volesus, also spelled Volusus, and perhaps also Valesus, is best known from Volesus, the founder of gens Valeria, who was said to have come to Rome with Titus Tatius, king of the Sabine town of Cures, during the reign of Romulus. The name was used by the early Valerii, first as praenomen, then as cognomen; Volusus was occasionally revived by that great patrician house, which used it as late as the first century AD. The form Volero was used by the plebeian gens Publilia. The name must have been used by the ancestors of the gens Volusia, whose nomen was derived from Volusus, and perhaps also by the Condetii and Vecilii, who used Volesus as a cognomen.

== Origin and meaning ==
Volesus may originally have been an Oscan praenomen that came to Rome with the founder of the Valerii. However, the name could also belong to a class of praenomina that was common to both Latin and Oscan. It was used by the Latin Publilii, and treated as a Latin name by the scholar Varro, who listed it amongst several antique praenomina, no longer in general use during the first century BC. Volesus is most likely derived from the Latin verb valere, "to be strong", or its Oscan cognate; however, Chase prefers a derivation from volo, "to wish" or "desire".

== Bibliography ==
- Liber de Praenominibus, a short treatise of uncertain authorship, traditionally appended to Valerius Maximus' Factorum ac Dictorum Memorabilium (Memorable Facts and Sayings).
- Dictionary of Greek and Roman Biography and Mythology, William Smith, ed., Little, Brown and Company, Boston (1849).
- August Pauly, Georg Wissowa, et alii, Realencyclopädie der Classischen Altertumswissenschaft (Scientific Encyclopedia of the Knowledge of Classical Antiquities, abbreviated RE or PW), J. B. Metzler, Stuttgart (1894–1980).
- George Davis Chase, "The Origin of Roman Praenomina", in Harvard Studies in Classical Philology, vol. VIII, pp. 103–184 (1897).
