= Lucius Valerius Messalla Thrasea Priscus =

Roman consul in 196 AD

Lucius Valerius Messalla Thrasea Priscus (died c. 212) was a Roman senator active during the reigns of Commodus and Septimius Severus.

== Life ==
Thrasea Priscus was a member of the second century gens Valeria. It is possible he was the son of Lucius Vipstanus Poplicola Messalla, who may have been a praetor designatus but died before he acceded to the consulate, by his wife Helvidia Priscilla. If so, Thrasea Priscus altered his gentilicum to reflect his descent through the Vipstani from the republican Valerii. He was appointed consul in 196 as the colleague of Gaius Domitius Dexter. After stepping down from the consulate, Thrasea Priscus may have held the office of curator aquarum (or supervisor of aqueducts) in Rome, around 198.

Thrasea Priscus may have been a partisan of Publius Septimius Geta, the brother and rival of the emperor Caracalla. He became one of the victims of the earliest purges of Caracalla, being struck down in the emperor's presence after the murder of Geta.

Christian Settipani has speculated that Thrasea Priscus married Coelia Balbina, possibly the daughter of Marcus Aquilius Coelius Apollinaris, and a very close relative of the future Emperor Balbinus, due to the appearance of the cognomen Balbinus in his great-grandson's name. It is believed that Thrasea Priscus had a son, Lucius Valerius Messalla, who was consul in 214.

== Ancestry ==
Ancestors of Lucius Valerius Messalla Thrasea Priscus

16. Gaius Vipstanus Messalla Gallus
8. Lucius Vipstanus Messalla
4. Lucius Vipstanus Messalla
2. Lucius Vipstanus Poplicola Messalla
1. Lucius Valerius Messalla Thrasea Priscus
6. Publius Helvidius Priscus
3. Helvidia Priscilla
7. Plautia Quinctilia

== Sources ==
- Mennen, Inge, Power and Status in the Roman Empire, AD 193-284 (2011)

Political offices
Preceded by Publius Julius Scapula Tertullus Priscus, and Quintus Tineius Clemens	Consul of the Roman Empire; 196 with Gaius Domitius Dexter II	Succeeded by Titus Sextius Magius Lateranus, and Cuspius Rufinus
