= Valerius Maximus Basilius =

Roman senator

Valerius Maximus signo Basilius (fl. 319–323) was a prominent Roman senator during the reign of the emperor Constantine I.

== Life ==
A pagan, he must have had a successful political career, as he managed to be appointed urban prefect of Rome (praefectus urbi Romae), serving from 1 September 319 until 13 September 323. He held this post while Constantine was campaigning in the Balkans, and the emperor's son, the Caesar Crispus was at Augusta Treverorum. The abnormally long period of time he held this post, and the extended imperial absence, indicate that he was a trusted imperial subordinate.

Valerius Maximus was either the son of Lucius Valerius Messalla, consul in 280, or (more likely) another descendant of the first's father Lucius Valerius Poplicola Balbinus Maximus, consul in 253, thus paternal nephew of the first.

He was probably the father of Valerius Maximus and, by Melania the Elder, Valerius Publicola.

== Ancestry ==
Ancestors of Valerius Maximus signo Basilius

16. Lucius Valerius Messalla
8. Lucius Valerius Claudius Acilius Priscillianus Maximus
17. Claudia Acilia Priscilliana
4. Lucius Valerius Poplicola Balbinus Maximus
2. Lucius Valerius Messalla
1. Valerius Maximus signo Basilius

Political offices
| Preceded by Septimius Bassus | Praefectus urbi of Rome; 319–323 | Succeeded by Locrius Verinus |
