= Saint Melania =

Saint Melania may refer to:

- Saint Melania the Elder
- Saint Melania the Younger
