= Titus Sextius Magius Lateranus (consul 197) =

Late 2nd century Roman senator and consul

Titus Sextius Magius Lateranus was a Roman Senator who lived in the Roman Empire in the second half of the 2nd century and first half of the 3rd century. He was ordinary consul for the year 197 with Cuspius Rufinus as his colleague.

Lateranus was a member of the Republican gens Sextia. He was the son of Titus Sextius Lateranus, consul in 154.

In 195, Lateranus supported the Emperor Septimius Severus in his military campaign against the Parthian Empire, serving as a Dux exercitus, his only recorded military position. In recognition of this service, the emperor rewarded Lateranus with an ordinary consulship in 197.

As Lateranus was a very wealthy, powerful, and influential Roman Patrician, he owned a house in Rome near the emperor.

== Sources ==
- I. Mennen, Power and Status of the Roman Empire, AD 193-284, BRILL, 2011

Political offices
Preceded by Gaius Domitius Dexter II, and Lucius Valerius Messalla Thrasea Priscus	Consul of the Roman Empire; 197 with Cuspius Rufinus	Succeeded by Publius Martius Sergius Saturninus, and Lucius Aurelius Gallus
