= Lucius Vipstanus Poplicola =

1st century AD Roman senator, consul and governor

Lucius Vipstanus Poplicola Messalla (c. 10 – aft. 59) was a Roman Senator.

== Life ==
Messalla was ordinary consul in 48 as the colleague of the future emperor Vitellius.

Based on the elements of his cognomeni Poplicola Messalla, Ronald Syme suggested that Vipstanus Poplicola was the son of Lucius Vipstanus Gallus and a postulated Valeria Messallia, paternal granddaughter of Marcus Valerius Messalla Corvinus. He completed his consulate in July 48, and was succeeded by the consul suffectus Gaius Vipstanus Messalla Gallus, who has been suggested to have been his brother, also based on the elements of his cognomen Messalla.

For the term 58/59, the sortition awarded Vipstanus Poplicola proconsular governor of Asia.

According to Syme, Vipstanus Poplicola's son was Gaius Valerius Poplicola, who was co-opted into a sacerdotal college in 63, but is not heard of afterwards, possibly having died before being old enough to accede to the consulate.

== See also ==
- List of Roman consuls

Political offices
Preceded by Gnaeus Hosidius Geta, and Gaius Volasenna Severus as Suffect consuls	Consul of the Roman Empire; 48 with Aulus Vitellius	Succeeded by Quintus Veranius Nepos, and Gaius Pompeius Longus Gallus as Suffect consuls
