= Seleucus (Roman usurper) =

3rd century Roman imperial usurper

Seleucus (fl. c. 221) was a Roman usurper.

Seleucus was, according to the 5th-century historian Polemius Silvius, a usurper against Emperor Elagabalus. His identity is not known: he could be Julius Antonius Seleucus, governor in Moesia, or Marcus Flavius Vitellius Seleucus, consul for 221.

Political offices
| Preceded by Elagabalus, Publius Valerius Comazon | Consul of the Roman Empire; 221 with Gaius Vettius Gratus Sabinianus | Succeeded by Elagabalus, Alexander Severus |
