= Lucius Vipstanus Gallus =

Early 1st century Roman senator

Lucius Vipstanus Gallus (died 17) was a Roman senator who is the first documented member of the gens Vipstana. His descendants and relatives include several consuls.

== Life ==
He is a member of a family that originated from the Aequi who were enrolled in the tribe Claudia. They came to prominence during the reign of Tiberius, Vipstanus. Gallus reached the office of praetor in 17, the year of his death. He is known to have at least one relative, Marcus Vipstanus Gallus (suffect consul in 18). It is unknown whether Marcus was a brother or a cousin of Lucius.

Out of the next generation, two Vipstanis are known, the cognomina "Messalla" and "Poplicola". This led Ronald Syme to observe that either Lucius or Marcus married a daughter of Marcus Valerius Messalla Messallinus and Claudia Marcella Minor, who is named Valeria Messallia. This alliance with the gens Valeria led to the prominence of the family during the first centuries of the Roman Empire. According to the French historian Christian Settipani, after the death of her husband Paullus Aemilius Lepidus, Marcella married the Roman Senator Marcus Valerius Messalla Messallinus. Marcella bore Messallinus a daughter called Valeria Messallia, born ca. 10 BC, who later married the praetor of 17, Lucius Vipstanus Gallus. However, Messallinus, son of Corvinus, was younger than Marcella. That fact does not prevent the marriage, but makes it unlikely, given Roman tradition.

From this marriage, the next generation of Vipstani came, two of whom achieved consular rank: Lucius Vipstanus Poplicola and Gaius Vipstanus Messalla Gallus.
