= Volesus =

Volesus or Volusus, sometimes called Volesus Valerius, was the legendary eponymous ancestor of gens Valeria, one of the great patrician houses at Rome. He is said to have come to Rome with Titus Tatius, king of the Sabine town of Cures, during the reign of Romulus, the founder and first king of Rome.

== Biographical details ==
Little is known of Volesus, but he was a Sabine and presumably also came from the town of Cures. The few mentions of him imply that he was a powerful warrior, which would explain his presence in the retinue of Titus Tatius, although his character may also have been suggested by his name, which was believed to derive from the Latin verb, valere, to be strong, or its Oscan cognate. If a real figure, he would probably have been born early in the 8th century BC.

== Legacy ==
As related by the historian Livy and others, one component of the early Roman populace was of Sabine origin, and Volesus was claimed as ancestor by one of the oldest, largest, and noblest houses at Rome, the Valerii, who held every magistracy of the Roman Republic, included scholars, statesmen, and generals, and were in the forefront of public affairs throughout the whole of Roman history.

The praenomen Volesus gave rise to the nomen Valerius through the regular evolution of Latin and was rarely used even in archaic Rome, though the family revived it from time to time, after it had fallen out of general use, as late as the 1st century AD. The Valerii also used it as a cognomen, usually with the spelling Volusus. The name was used by a few other gentes, including the gens Publilia, who used the form Volero.

== See also ==
- Valerius
- Praenomen
