= Arrianus (historian) =

Ancient Greek historian

Arrianus (Greek: Ἀρριανός) was a historian of ancient Greece, who lived at, or shortly after, the time of Gaius Julius Verus Maximus, and wrote a history of emperor Maximinus Thrax and the Gordiani.

It is not improbable that he may be the same as Lucius Annius Arrianus, who is mentioned as consul in 243 CE.
