= Gratus (consul 280) =

3rd century Roman senator and consul in 280

Gratus, possibly named Gaius Vettius Gratus (fl. 3rd century), was a Roman senator who was appointed consul in AD 280. Gratus was probably the son of Vettius Gratus, who was consul in AD 250. Gratus himself was appointed consul posterior alongside Lucius Valerius Messalla in AD 280.

== Sources ==
- Martindale, John R.; Jones, A. H. M.; Morris, John, eds. (1971). The Prosopography of the Later Roman Empire: Volume I, AD 260–395. Cambridge: Cambridge University Press. ISBN 0-521-07233-6.
- Mennen, Inge, Power and Status in the Roman Empire, AD 193-284 (2011)

Political offices
Preceded by Marcus Aurelius Probus III; Nonius Paternus II	Consul of the Roman Empire; 280 with Lucius Valerius Messalla	Succeeded by Marcus Aurelius Probus IV; Junius Tiberianus
