= Gaius Vettius Gratus Sabinianus =

3rd century Roman senator and consul

Gaius Vettius Gratus Sabinianus (c. 180 – c. 225) was a Roman senator who was appointed consul in AD 221.

== Biography ==
A member of the Gens Vetti, Gratus Sabinianus was probably the grandson of Gaius Vettius Sabinianus Julius Hospes, suffect consul around AD 176. Presumably a recently established Patrician, he began his career in the military, serving as the sevir equitum Romanorum (or commander) of the 3rd Turmae. He then received a commission as a military tribune of the Legio VII Claudia. With the emperor's consent, he turned his eye to a political career. He may have been selected as an imperial candidate for the office of quaestor, followed by his nomination for the office of praetor tutelarius, responsible for matters pertaining to guardianships.

Gratus Sabinianus’ next appointment was as the curator of the Via Flaminia, and included responsibility for the supply of food into Rome. He was then elected as consul prior alongside Marcus Flavius Vitellius Seleucus in AD 221. It is speculated that Gratus Sabinianus died shortly after his consulship.

Gratus Sabinianus had at least one son, Gaius Vettius Gratus Atticus Sabinianus, who was elected consul in AD 242.

== Sources ==
- Mennen, Inge, Power and Status in the Roman Empire, AD 193-284 (2011)

Political offices
Preceded by Marcus Aurelius Antoninus III; Publius Valerius Comazon	Consul of the Roman Empire; 221 with Marcus Flavius Vitellius Seleucus	Succeeded by Marcus Aurelius Antoninus IV; Marcus Aurelius Severus Alexander
