= Lucius Valerius Messalla (consul 214) =

3rd century Roman senator and consul

Lucius Valerius Messalla (fl. 3rd century) was a Roman senator.

== Life ==
Messalla, a member of the third century gens Valeria, was possibly the son of Lucius Valerius Messalla Thrasea Priscus and speculatively his wife Coelia Balbina, since the cognomen Balbinus appears in their great-grandson's name. He apparently did not suffer any repercussions following the purge that saw his father put to death on the orders of the emperor Caracalla in 212, and in fact he was appointed consul prior in 214, alongside Gaius Octavius Appius Suetrius Sabinus.

It is believed this Messalla was the Valerius Messalla who was the proconsul of Asia sometime between 236 and 238. If so, there must have been some political circumstance that resulted in such a lengthy gap between his consulship and the proconsular governorship.

Christian Settipani has speculated, due to the combination of both's nomina and cognomina, that Messalla married Claudia Acilia Priscilliana, daughter of Tiberius Claudius Cleobulus and wife and first cousin Acilia Frestana, and that they may have been the parents of Lucius Valerius Claudius Acilius Priscillianus Maximus, who was twice consul.

== Ancestry ==
Ancestors of Lucius Valerius Messalla

16. Lucius Vipstanus Messalla
8. Lucius Vipstanus Messalla
4. Lucius Vipstanus Poplicola Messalla
2. Lucius Valerius Messalla Thrasea Priscus
10. Publius Helvidius Priscus
5. Helvidia Priscilla
11. Plautia Quinctilia
1. Lucius Valerius Messalla

== Sources ==
- Mennen, Inge, Power and Status in the Roman Empire, AD 193-284 (2011)

Political offices
Preceded by Marcus Aurelius Antoninus IV, and Decimus Caelius Calvinus Balbinus II	Consul of the Roman Empire; 214 with Gaius Octavius Appius Suetrius Sabinus; Aemilianus	Succeeded by Quintus Maecius Laetus II, and Marcus Munatius Sulla Cerialis
