= Arrianus (poet) =

Ancient Greek poet

Arrianus (Greek: Ἀρριανός) was a poet of ancient Greece who, according to the Suda, made a Greek translation in hexameter verse of Virgil's Georgics, and wrote an epic poem on the exploits of Alexander the Great (Ἀλεξανδρίας), as well as a poem on Attalus I.

Scholars have pointed out that there are some contradictions in this list of accomplishments in the Suda. Perhaps chief among which is that it is not clear how likely it is a poet, who lived in or after the time of Virgil – that is, the first century CE – would write a poem on Attalus I – a political figure from the 3rd century BCE – as it is assumed the author of the poem was more of a contemporary of Attalus, though scholars have speculated it may be the case that Arrianus was, or wrote the poem for, one of the later descendants of the family of the Attali.

It is, however, not improbable that in the Suda, Arrianus is confused with one or more poets with the same or similar name. It is widely speculated, for example, that this Arrianus's works are confused with those of Adrianus.
