= Lucius Vipstanus Poplicola Messalla =

2nd century Roman patrician senator and tresviri monetalis

Lucius Vipstanus Poplicola Messalla was a patrician senator.

== Life ==
He was the son of Lucius Vipstanus Messalla, ordinary consul in 115. The presence of the cognomina "Popicola" and "Messalla" indicates that he was related to the Valerii through his father.

He is identified with the subject of a fragmentary inscription recovered from Tibur. According to this inscription, Messalla's public career began with as one of the tresviri monetalis, the most prestigious of the four boards that comprise the vigintiviri; assignment to this board was usually allocated to patricians or favored individuals. This was followed by admission to the salii Colini; the latest recorded office Messalla held was quattuorvir quinquennalis gabiis in 140.

It is unclear why Messalla did not proceed to the consulate. Some have speculated that he renounced a senatorial career, but Ronald Syme believes it is more likely Messalla died before he came of age to hold the office. He may have been a praetor designatus but died before he acceded to the consulate.

He married Helvidia Priscilla, born c. 115, daughter of Publius Helvidius Priscus and wife Plautia Quinctilia. It is possible they were the parents of Lucius Valerius Messalla Thrasea Priscus. If so, Thrasea Priscus altered his gentilicum to reflect his descent through the Vipstani from the republican Valerii.

== Ancestry ==
Ancestors of Lucius Vipstanus Poplicola Messalla

16. Lucius Vipstanus Gallus
8. Gaius Vipstanus Messalla Gallus
17. "Valeria Messallia"
4. Lucius Vipstanus Messalla
2. Lucius Vipstanus Messalla
1. Lucius Vipstanus Poplicola Messalla
