= Vecilia gens =

Ancient Roman family

The gens Vecilia, occasionally written Vecillia, was an obscure plebeian family of ancient Rome. No members of this gens are mentioned by Roman writers, but a number are known from inscriptions. Some of the Vecilii were local officials or attained minor magistracies, but none of them attained any of the higher offices of the Roman state.

== Origin ==
The nomen Vecilius belongs to a large class of gentilicia formed using the suffix -ilius, typically formed from cognomina ending in the diminutive suffix -ulus, or using -illius or -ellius from surnames ending in the double diminutive -illus or -ellus. Vecilius seems to belong to the first group, although gentilicia written either with a single or double l can be difficult to distinguish. There was a mountain in Latium known as Mons Vecilius, which could supply the origin of this nomen, but from the occurrence of the filiation Vo. f. in an inscription from Falerii, Chase concludes that the Vecilii were probably of Etruscan descent.

== Praenomina ==
The chief praenomina of the Vecilii were Lucius, Gaius, and Marcus, the three most common names at all periods of Roman history. A few members of this gens bore other common praenomina, including Publius, Quintus, and Titus. An early inscription includes the filiation Vo. f., which Chase interprets as the Etruscan praenomen Volta. An undated inscription from Thermae Himeraeae in Sicily includes an example of the feminine praenomen Lucia.

== Members ==
This list includes abbreviated praenomina. For an explanation of this practice, see filiation.

- Gaius Vecilius L. f., named in a late second-century inscription from Falerii in Etruria, along with Lucius Vecilius, Pola Abeles, Plenes, and the brothers Lucius and Gaius Levieius.
- Lucius Vecilius Vo. f., named in a late second-century inscription from Falerii, along with Pola Abeles, Gaius Vecilius, Plenes, and the brothers Lucius and Gaius Levieius.
- Lucius Vecillius, one of the municipal quattuorvirs at Volturara in Apulia, according from an inscription dating from the second quarter of the first century BC. Two of his colleagues were Publius Luc[...] and Decimus Trebius.
- Lucius Vecilius L. l. Maes[...], a freedman named along with the freedman Gaius Ovidius Zenophilus in a funerary inscription from Rome, dating from the latter half of the first century BC.
- Publius Vecilius, named in a fragmentary inscription from Rome, dating between 30 and 20 BC.
- Quintus Vecilius, one of the municipal duumvirs of Caiatia in Campania, together with Marcus Mar[...], according to an inscription dating from the Augustan era.
- Marcus Vecilius M. f. L. n. Campus, used his own money to build an amphitheatre and a wall around it in honour of Augustus at Luceria in Apulia. Earlier he had served as praefectus fabrum, duumvir, and pontifex.
- Vecilia Ɔ. l. Hilara, a freedwoman named in an early first-century inscription from Rome, along with Lucius Vibius, Lucius Vibius Felicio Felix, and the freedwoman Vibia Prima.
- Titus Vecilius Felix, buried at Rome, along with his wife, the freedwoman Vettia Sabina, and several other persons, in a tomb dating from the first half of the first century.
- Gaius Vecilius Ɔ. l. Hera, a freedman named in an inscription from Rome, dating from the first half of the first century.
- Marcus Vecilius Verecundus, a vestiarius, or clothier, named in a tile inscription from Pompeii in Campania.
- Lucius Vecilius, one of several persons named in a first-century inscription from the Temple of Diana Nemorensis in Latium.
- Lucius Vecilius Basilis, buried in a first-century tomb at Thermae Himeraeae in Sicily, aged twelve.
- Vecilia Leva, the wife of Titus Asinius Severus, an unguentarius, or ointment-maker, with whom she was buried in a first-century tomb at Ancona in Picenum.
- Lucius Vecilius C. f. Modestus, held several minor offices and magistracies, including quaestor, military tribune of the Legio VI Ferrata in Syria, and prefect of several auxiliary units, commemorated in a first-century inscription from Timacum Minus in Moesia Superior.
- Vecilia Sabina, built a first-century tomb at Rome for herself and her husband, Tiberius Claudius Malus.
- Vecilia Tyrannis, a freedwoman of the emperor, built a temple to Jupiter and Hercules at the site of modern Guberevac, formerly part of Moesia Superior, dating between the latter half of the first century, and the early part of the second.
- Lucius Vecilius, made a first- or second-century offering to Isis at Baelo Claudia in Hispania Baetica.
- Titus Vecilius T. l. Phileros, a freedman named in an inscription from Rome.
- Vecilia Ɔ. l. Poemne, a freedwoman buried in a second-century tomb at Rome, built by her husband, Publius Silius Asylus for himself and Poemne.
- Gaius Vecilius C. f. Probus, dedicated a monument at Tibur in Latium, decreed by the local senate, for his friend, Lucius Roscius Aelianus Maecius Celer, dating from around the death of Trajan, and listing the various offices and magistracies that Celer had held, including quaestor, tribune of the plebs, military tribune of the Legio IX Hispana, governor of Africa, and consul, along with various honours that Celer had won.
- Gaius Vecilius Karus, along with Marcus Antonius Florus, quattuorvirs of Tibur, dedicated a monument on the Kalends of March, AD 143.
- Vecilia Homoea, the wife of Gaius Veianius, with whom she placed a monument statue in honour of their son, Gaius Veianius Orestinus, a soldier in the third cohort of the praetorian guard, who had been granted the insignia of a Decurion by the emperor, according to an inscription from Iader in Dalmatia, dating from the latter half of the second century.

=== Undated Vecilii ===
- Vecilia, buried at Thermae Himeraeae.
- Lucius Vecilius C. f., buried at Asta Regia in Hispania Baetica, in a tomb built in accordance with a will.
- Lucia Vecilia L. f., buried at Thermae Himeraeae, aged thirty.
- Lucius Vecilius Antioc(hus?), named on a pottery stamp from Athens in Achaia.
- Publius Vecilius Antiochus, named on several lead water pipes from Rome.
- Gaius Vecilius C. f. Florinus, buried at Tibur, aged forty years, eleven months, and fifteen days, in a tomb built by his parents, Gaius Vecilius Florus and Vecilia Primitiva.
- Gaius Vecilius Florus, together with his wife, Vecilia Primitiva, built a tomb at Tibur for their son, Gaius Vecilius Florinus.
- Vecilia Lucilia, dedicated a tomb at Antipolis in Gallia Narbonensis for her daughter, Vesuccia Hermogenia.
- Marcus Vecilius Marcellus, buried at Rodigium in Venetia and Histria, along with his wife, Attia Pupa, and their children, Vecilia Prisca and Marcus Vecilius Praesens, in a tomb built by order of Attia's will.
- Marcus Vecilius M. f. Praesens, buried at Rodigium, along with his parents, Marcus Vecilius Marcellus and Attia Pupa, and his sister, Vecilia Prisca, in a tomb built by order of his mother's will.
- Vecilia Primitiva, together with her husband, Gaius Vecilius Florus, built a tomb at Tibur for their son, Gaius Vecilius Florinus.
- Vecilia M. f. Prisca, buried at Rodigium, along with her parents, Marcus Vecilius Marcellus and Attia Pupa, and her brother, Marcus Vecilius Praesens, in a tomb built by order of her mother's will.
- Lucius Vecilius Valerianus, buried at Thermae Himeraeae, aged thirteen, along with Lucius Vecilius Vecilianus.
- Lucius Vecilius Vecilianus, buried at Thermae Himeraeae, aged eight, along with Lucius Vecilius Vecilianus.

== See also ==
- List of Roman gentes

== Bibliography ==
- Livia Bivona, Iscrizioni latine lapidarie del museo civico di Termini Imerese (Latin Lapidary Inscriptions from the Municipal Museum of Termini Imerese), Rome (1994).
- Jean-Noël Bonneville, Sylvie Dardaine, and Patrick Le Roux: Belo 5: l'Épigraphie. Les inscriptions romaines de Baelo Claudia (Belo 5: The Epigraphy. The Roman Inscriptions of Baelo Claudia), Madrid (1988).
- Bullettino della Commissione Archeologica Comunale in Roma (Bulletin of the Municipal Archaeological Commission of Rome, abbreviated BCAR), (1872–present).
- René Cagnat et alii, L'Année épigraphique (The Year in Epigraphy, abbreviated AE), Presses Universitaires de France (1888–present).
- La Carte Archéologique de la Gaule (Archaeological Map of Gaul, abbreviated CAG), Académie des Inscriptions et Belles-Lettres (1931–present).
- George Davis Chase, "The Origin of Roman Praenomina", in Harvard Studies in Classical Philology, vol. VIII, pp. 103–184 (1897).
- Gian Luca Gregori, La collezione epigrafica dell'antiquarium comunale del Celio (The Epigraphic Collection of the Ancient Community of the Caelian Hill), Quasar, Rome (2001).
- Julián González, Inscripciones Romanas de la Provincia de Cádiz (Roman Inscriptions from the Province of Cadiz), Cadiz (1982).
- Wilhelm Henzen, Ephemeris Epigraphica: Corporis Inscriptionum Latinarum Supplementum (Journal of Inscriptions: Supplement to the Corpus Inscriptionum Latinarum, abbreviated EE), Institute of Roman Archaeology, Rome (1872–1913).
- Inscriptiones Italiae (Inscriptions from Italy), Rome (1931-present).
- Theodor Mommsen et alii, Corpus Inscriptionum Latinarum (The Body of Latin Inscriptions, abbreviated CIL), Berlin-Brandenburgische Akademie der Wissenschaften (1853–present).
- Fanou Papazoglou, Inscriptions de la Mésie Supérieure (Inscriptions of Moesia Superior), Belgrade (1976–present).
