= Septimius Bassus =

Early 4th-century Roman politician and official

Septimius Bassus (fl. 317–319) was a Roman politician, and a member of the Septimia gens.

== Life ==
Bassus was born in a senatorial family, the son of Lucius Septimius Severus (born c. 245) and wife Pomponia Bassa (born c. 250). His paternal grandfather was a Lucius Septimius (born c. 210), son of Gaius Septimius Severus Aper, while his maternal grandparents were the Roman Senator Pomponius Bassus and wife the noblewoman Pomponia Gratidia. Through his maternal grandfather, Bassus was a descendant of the Roman emperor Marcus Aurelius, Roman empress Faustina the Younger and of the former ruling Nerva–Antonine dynasty of the Roman Empire.

Bassus was praefectus urbi of Rome between 317 (he is attested in office on 15 May) until 319 (at least until 1 September). Between 13 July and 13 August 318, he was at court; for this reason he was substituted by Julius Cassius.

He had a daughter, Septimia Bassa, born c. 305, who was the first wife of Valerius Maximus Basilius.

== Ancestry ==
Ancestors of Septimius Bassus

16. ... Septimius ...
8. Gaius Septimius Severus Aper
4. Lucius Septimius ...
2. Lucius Septimius Severus
1. Septimius Bassus
24. Gaius Pomponius Bassus Terentianus
12. Pomponius Bassus
6. Pomponius Bassus
26. Tiberius Claudius Severus Proculus
13. Annia Aurelia Faustina
27. Annia Faustina
3. Pomponia Bassa
7. Pomponia Gratidia

Political offices
Preceded by Ovinius Gallicanus	Praefectus urbi of Rome; May 317 – September 319	Succeeded by Valerius Maximus Basilius
