= Lucius Annius Arrianus =

Roman senator and consul in 243

Lucius Annius Arrianus (fl. 3rd century) was a Roman senator who was appointed consul in AD 243.

Political offices
Preceded by Gaius Vettius Gratus Atticus Sabinianus II; Gaius Asinius Lepidus Praetextatus	Consul of the Roman Empire; 243 with Gaius Cervonius Papus	Succeeded by Tiberius Pollenius Armenius Peregrinus; Lucius Fulvius Aemilianus
