= Quintus Veranius =

1st century AD Roman general, consul and governor

Quintus Veranius (died 57 CE) was a Roman general around the mid-first century CE. He was III vir monetalis, tribune of Legio IV Scythica and quaestor under Tiberius. He was appointed tribune of the plebs in 41 and praetor in 42. In 43, the Emperor Claudius constituted the new province of Lycia, and appointed Veranius as its governor. He governed the province until 48, and during this period put down the rebellion of Cilicia Trachea. He served as consul in 49, and was elevated to patrician status by Claudius, who also appointed him as an augur.

Veranius became governor of Britain in 57, replacing Aulus Didius Gallus. He reversed Didius's policy of maintaining existing borders and began military operations against the troublesome Silures in what is now Wales, but died within a year. In his will he flattered Nero and claimed that, had he had another two years, he would have conquered the whole of the island. He was replaced by Gaius Suetonius Paulinus, and the speed with which Suetonius took Wales suggests that Veranius had already done much of the work. Onasander, a Greek philosopher, dedicated his Strategikos, a treatise on generalship, to Veranius, at some point between his consulship (49) and death (57/58).

Political offices
Preceded by Lucius Vitellius, and Gaius Vipstanus Messalla Gallus as Suffect Consuls	Consul of the Roman Empire; 49 with Gaius Pompeius Longus Gallus	Succeeded by Lucius Mammius Pollio, and Quintus Allius Maximus as Suffect Consuls
Preceded by Aulus Didius Gallus	Governor of Britain; 57	Succeeded by Gaius Suetonius Paulinus
