= Arrianus (astronomer) =

Ancient Greek astronomer

Arrianus (Greek: Ἀρριανός) was an astronomer of ancient Greece who probably lived as early as the time of Eratosthenes (that is, the 2nd century BCE), and who wrote a work on meteors, of which a fragment is preserved in Joannes Philoponus's commentary on the Meteorologica of Aristotle.

He also wrote a short work on comets, to prove that they had no supernatural significance and foreboded neither good nor evil. Some writers ascribe this work to Arrian instead. A few fragments of it are preserved in Stobaeus.
