= Publius Valerius Comazon =

3rd century Roman general and praetorian prefect

Publius Valerius Eutychianus Comazon
- Died: After 222; Rome
- Military career
- Allegiance: Roman Empire
- Service years: 218–219
- Rank: Praetorian prefect
- Commands: Legio III Gallica (??–218); Praetorian Guard (218–219)
- Other work: Consul of the Roman Empire in 220; City prefect of Rome in 220, 221 and 222

Publius Valerius Eutychianus Comazon (died after 222) was a Roman general and ally of emperor Elagabalus. Comazon began his career as an ordinary army recruit under the Emperor Commodus, whom he served as a soldier in the province of Thrace. While there he suffered a demotion from the provincial government under Tiberius Claudius Attalus Paterculianus. However, this incident did not permanently affect his military career.

In the year 218 he commanded the Legio II Parthica, which was temporarily stationed in Apamea in Syria. Upon the accession of Macrinus as emperor in 217, Comazon orchestrated a revolt among the members of Legio III Gallica to help secure the throne for Elagabalus, who was tied to the Severan dynasty. Comazon was later rewarded with various important offices in the Empire, including prefect of Elagabalus' bodyguard, known as the Praetorian Guard, consul in 220 and an unprecedented three terms as City prefect in 220, 221 and 222.

Elagabalus proved to be a highly unpopular ruler, and after barely four years in office, he was murdered by members of the Praetorian Guard who proclaimed his cousin Alexander Severus emperor in his place. However Comazon survived the overthrow and under the new Emperor again assumed the office of city prefect. It can be concluded that he retired after the conclusion of his tenure, but his date of death is not known.

Political offices
Preceded by Elagabalus, Quintus Tineius Sacerdos	Consul of the Roman Empire; 220 with Elagabalus	Succeeded by Gaius Vettius Gratus Sabinianus, Marcus Flavius Vitellius Seleucus
