= Arrianus (jurist) =

Ancient Roman jurist

Arrianus was a Roman jurisconsult of uncertain date. He probably lived under Trajan, and, according to the conjecture of Grotius, is perhaps the same person as the orator Arrianus, who corresponded with Pliny the Younger. He may also possibly be identical with the Arrianus Severus, praefectus aerarii, whose opinion concerning a constitution Divi Trajani is cited by Aburnus Valens. He wrote a treatise de Interdictis of which the second book is quoted in the Pandects in an extract from Ulpian. In that extract, Proculus, who lived under Tiberius, is mentioned in such a manner, that he might be supposed to have written after Arrianus. There is no direct extract from Arrianus in the Pandects, though he is several times mentioned.
