= Arianus =

Arianus may refer to:

- Arianus (Ancient Greek: Ἀριανός) was an ancient Greek of the 3rd century BCE; he was a friend of Bolis, and was employed by him to betray Achaeus to Antiochus III the Great in 214 BCE.
- From Ariana, a term used by some Greek and Roman authors for a wide area of Central Asia
- From Arius, an Achaemenid region centered on the city of Herat in present-day western Afghanistan
- Saint Arianus, 3rd century governor of Ansena, killer of martyrs such as Saint Colluthus, later a Coptic saint himself
- Arianus, a fictional world in the Death Gate Cycle by Margaret Weis and Tracy Hickman
- Apodemus arianus, a mouse of family Muridae
- Eriophyes arianus, a species of acari in genus Eriophyes

== See also ==
- Arianus's rat, a rat of family Muridae
- Arrianus (disambiguation)
- Ariano (disambiguation)
- Arius
