= Melania the Elder =

Holy Land saint (c. 350 – before 410 or c. 417)

Saint Melania the Elder
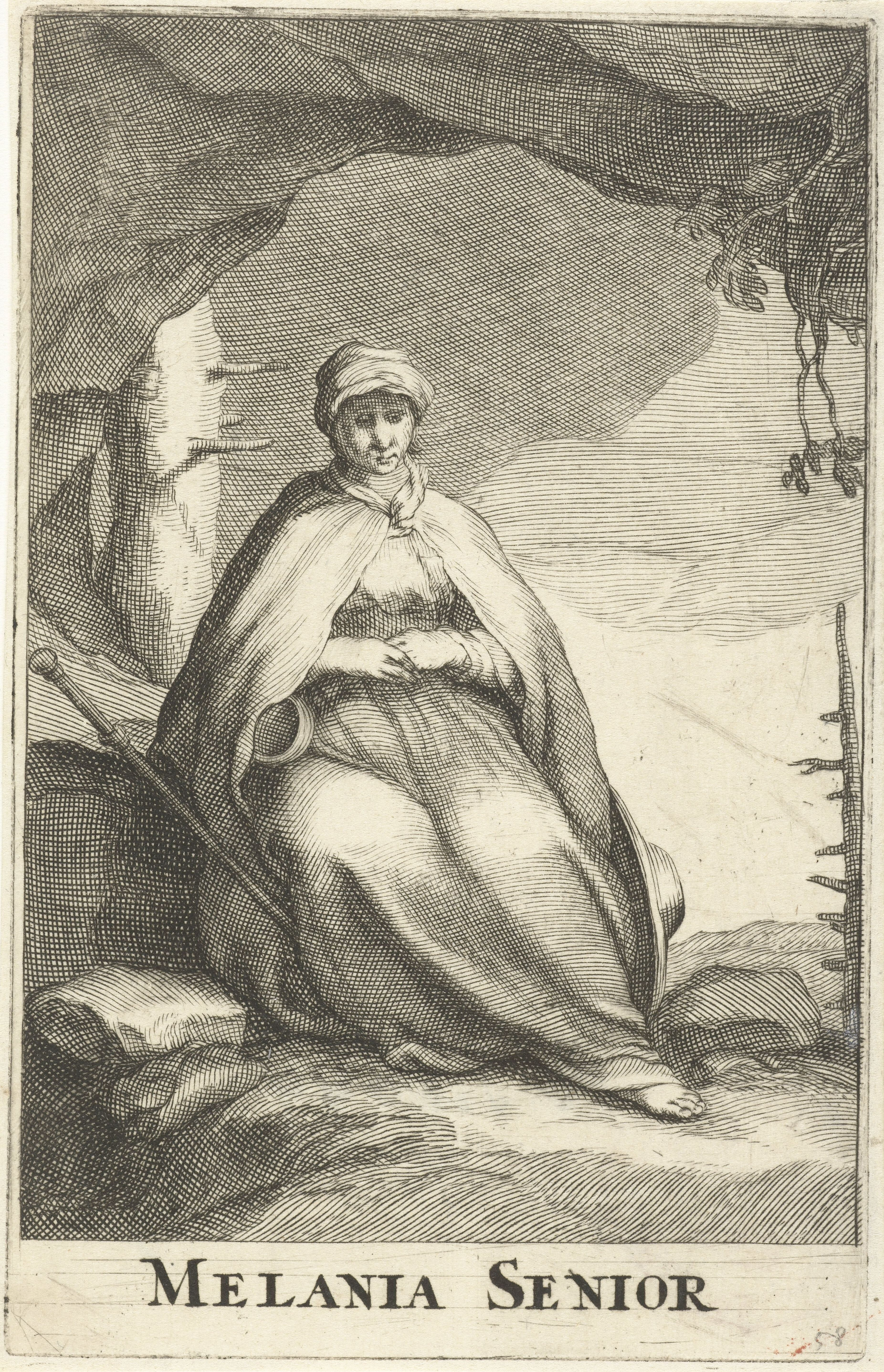
- Born: ca. 350; Spain
- Died: bef. 410 or ca. 417; Jerusalem
- Venerated in: Eastern Orthodox Church; Anglican Communion
- Feast: June 8

Melania the Elder, Latin Melania Maior (c. 350 – before 410 or c. 417) was a Desert Mother who was an influential figure in the Christian ascetic movement (the Desert Fathers and Mothers) that sprang up in the generation after the Emperor Constantine made Christianity a legal religion of the Roman Empire. She was a contemporary of, and well known to, Abba Macarius and other Desert Fathers in Egypt, Jerome, Augustine of Hippo, Paulinus of Nola (her cousin or cousin-in-law; he gives a colorful description of her visit to Nola in his Letters), and Evagrius of Pontus, and she founded two religious communities on the Mount of Olives in Jerusalem. She stands out for the double monastery she founded - a convent for herself, and a second monastery for monks dedicated to her spiritual companion, Rufinus of Aquileia, which belong to the earliest Christian monastic communities, and because she promoted the asceticism which she, as a follower of Origen, considered indispensable for salvation.

== Life ==
=== Pagan period ===
Melania the Elder (c. 350 – c. 410) was born in Hispania and became one of the wealthiest citizens of the empire. Her father, Marcellinus, was of consular rank and she was related to Paulinus of Nola. She was married at fourteen, and moved with her husband (probably Valerius Maximus signo Basilius of the powerful patrician family of gens Valeria, or possibly a politician named Maximus) to the suburbs of Rome. Her husband and two out of three sons had died by the time she was twenty-two.

=== With the Egyptian monks ===
She became a Christian in Rome and, leaving her son, Valerius Publicola, with a guardian, set off to Alexandria, accompanied by her servants, to join other Christian ascetics to visit the monks at Nitria. Christine Schenk CSJ writes that she "used her wealth and influence to help monks, priests, and bishops in the Nitrian Desert."

She stayed with the monks in the desert near Alexandria, Egypt (today the area is known as Wadi Natroun) for about six months. When persecution broke out after the death of Bishop Athanasius in 373 and many of the monks were exiled to Diocaesaraea in Palestine, Melania followed and supported them financially. The governor had her briefly imprisoned, but released her when he realized her social status.

=== Jerusalem ===
She built a convent in Jerusalem, and a monastery on the Mount of Olives for the monk and theologian Rufinus of Aquileia.

Because of her involvement as a pro-Origenist in the controversy over Origen in the 390s, Jerome was especially vitriolic about her, punning on her name and calling her "black in name and black in nature." (He tried to expunge his earlier lavish praises of her from his writings.) Palladius of Galatia described her as "a very learned lady who loved the world".

=== Visit to Rome and North Africa ===
Around the year 400 she left for Rome to see her son, who had married Caeionia Albina, daughter of Caeionius Rufius Albinus. Due to her influence, her granddaughter, known as Melania the Younger, would later take up the religious life. She also visited Paulinus and Therasia of Nola and brought him a relic of the True Cross. Augustine of Hippo wrote Paulinus that his kinswoman was in North Africa when her son, Valerius, died in 406.

== Veneration ==
She is regarded as a saint and her feast day is June 8.

== Influence ==
She was a spiritual mentor to Evagrius of Pontus, author of some texts found in the Eastern Orthodox Philokalia. She persuaded him to go to Egypt to join the desert ascetics and carried on a correspondence with him while he was there.

== See also ==
- Paula of Rome, contemporary with similar vita

== General and cited references ==
- Palladius, "Melania the Elder", The Lausiac History. Chapter XLVI
- Isaiah (2001). Matericon: Instructions of the Abba Isaiah to the Honorable Nun Theodora. Translated by St. Paisius Serbian Orthodox Monastery. Safford, Arizona: St. Paisius Serbian Orthodox Monastery. pp. 37–94.
- Ruether, Rosemary. "Mothers of the Church: Ascetic Women in the Late Patristic Age", Women of Spirit: Female Leadership in the Jewish and Christian Traditions, (Rosemary Ruether and Eleanor McLaughlin, eds.), New York, Simon and Schuster, 1979.
