= Adrianus (poet) =

Ancient Greek poet

Adrianus (Gr. Αδριανός) was a Greek poet who wrote an epic poem on the history of Alexander the Great, which was called the Alexandriad (Αλεξανδριάς). What is chiefly known of this poem comes from a mention of the seventh book in the Suda, but only a fragment consisting of one line survives. The Suda mentions, among other poems, a work by a poet "Arrianus" called Alexandriad or Αλεξανδριάς, and there can be no doubt that this is the work of Adrianus, which is mistakenly attributed to this "Arrianus".
