= Lucius Vipstanus Messalla (orator) =

Roman military officer, senator and noted orator (c.45-c.80 AD)

Lucius Vipstanus Messalla (c. 45 – c. 80) was a Roman military officer, senator, and a noted orator. He appears as a character in Tacitus' Dialogus de oratoribus.

== Biography ==
Vipstanus Messalla is presumed to be the son of Gaius Vipstanus Messalla Gallus, suffect consul in 48. The younger Messalla was a tribunus militum in 69, stationed with the legion VII Claudia in Moesia which entered the civil war against the emperor Vitellius. He was temporarily in command of the legion in September and October 69, after the legion's legate was forced to flee for his life; later, Messalla wrote an account of the campaign.

Messalla was a friend of the historian Tacitus, who used Messalla's account of the campaign in his own work Histories. Tacitus described Messalla as an outstanding orator; in AD 70, Vipstanus Messalla, who was not yet of senatorial age, defended his older half-brother, the notorious informer Marcus Aquilius Regulus in the Curia Julia. Massalla's family's prestige was sufficient to sway enough of the Senate to reject the charges laid against Regulus.

Messalla likely died during the reign of Titus, possibly during the epidemic that swept through the city in 80. He had at least one son, also named Lucius Vipstanus Messalla.
