= Gaius Vipstanus Messalla Gallus =

1st century AD Roman senator, consul and proconsul

(Gaius) Vipstanus Messalla Gallus (c. 10 BC – aft. 60) was a Roman senator.

== Life ==
He was consul suffectus in the nundinium of July–December 48 as the colleague of Lucius Vitellius. J. Devrecker has offered the argument that the elements in his name ought to be set out as Gaius Messalla Vipstanus Gallus.

Gallus has been identified as the proconsul of Asia for the term 59/60.

Based on the elements of his cognomen Messalla, Ronald Syme suggested that Vipstanus Messalla Gallus was the son of Lucius Vipstanus Gallus and a postulated Valeria Messallia, paternal granddaughter of Marcus Valerius Messalla Corvinus. He succeeded as consul suffectus Lucius Vipstanus Poplicola Messalla, who completed his consulate in July 48, and who has been suggested to have been his brother, also based on the elements of his cognomeni Poplicola Messalla.

It is also surmised that Gallus is the father of the orator Lucius Vipstanus Messalla. Gallus' wife had earlier been married to Lucius Aquillius Lucius filius Regulus, the pontifex and quaestor of Tiberius mentioned in CIL VI, 2122, and by whom she had a son named Marcus Aquilius Regulus. She has not yet been identified.

Political offices
Preceded by Aulus Vitellius, and Lucius Vipstanus Poplicola	Suffect Consul of the Roman Empire; AD 48 with Lucius Vitellius	Succeeded by Quintus Veranius, and Gaius Pompeius Longus Gallus
