= Tiberius Claudius Cleobulus =

Roman senator and consul (c.165–c.213 AD)

Tiberius Claudius Cleobulus (c. 165 – c. 213 AD) was a Roman senator.

== Life ==
He held the position of suffect consul for one nundinium around 210.

Claudius was the son of an earlier Tiberius Claudius Cleobulus (c. 135 – c. 180) and his wife Acilia, the daughter of Manius Acilius Glabrio Gnaeus Cornelius Severus and his wife Faustina. He married his first cousin, Acilia Frestana, who was the daughter of Manius Acilius Glabrio, consul in 186, and paternal niece of Acilia. Tiberius Claudius Cleobulus and his wife Acilia Frestana together had Claudia Acilia Priscilliana, who would later marry Lucius Valerius Messalla. He also had a son, Claudius Acilius Cleobulus.
