= Cuspia gens =

The gens Cuspia was a plebeian family of equestrian rank at ancient Rome. Few of its members obtained any of the higher offices of the Roman state, although Lucius Cuspius Camerinus attained the consulship in the time of Hadrian.

== Members ==
- Publius Cuspius, an eques, twice magister of the publicani who farmed the taxes in the province of Africa. Cicero indulged him by recommending a number of his friends to Quintus Valerius Orca, proconsul of Africa in 45 BC.
- Cuspius Fadus, an eques during the reign of the emperor Claudius, who appointed him Procurator of Judaea in AD 44, following the death of Herod Agrippa. His government was generally peaceful, although he suppressed a potential revolt by the self-proclaimed prophet Teudas and his followers, whom Fadus put to death.
- Gaius Cuspius Pansa, one of the last aediles of Pompeii before its destruction.
- Lucius Cuspius Camerinus, a descendant of Italian settlers in Pergamum, was consul suffectus in AD 126.
- Lucius Cuspius Pactumeius Rufinus, consul in AD 142.
- Cuspius Rufinus, consul in 197.

== See also ==
- List of Roman gentes

== Bibliography ==
- Marcus Tullius Cicero, Epistulae ad Familiares.
- Flavius Josephus, Antiquitates Judaïcae (Antiquities of the Jews); Bellum Judaïcum (The Jewish War).
- Publius Cornelius Tacitus, Historiae.
- Eusebius of Caesarea, Historia Ecclesiastica.
- Joannes Zonaras, Epitome Historiarum (Epitome of History).
- Dictionary of Greek and Roman Biography and Mythology, William Smith, ed., Little, Brown and Company, Boston (1849).
- Anthony R. Birley, "Hadrian and Greek Senators", in Zeitschrift für Papyrologie und Epigraphik, vol. 116 (1997).
