= Senate of the Roman Empire =

Historical political institution in ancient Rome

The Senate of the Roman Empire was a political institution in the ancient Roman Empire. After the fall of the Roman Republic, the constitutional balance of power shifted from the Roman Senate to the Roman Emperor. Beginning with the first emperor, Augustus, the Emperor and the Senate were technically two co-equal branches of government. In practice, however, the actual authority of the imperial Senate was negligible, as the Emperor held the true power of the state. As such, membership in the senate became sought after by individuals seeking prestige and social standing, rather than actual authority. During the reigns of the first Emperors, legislative, judicial, and electoral powers were all transferred from the "Roman assemblies" to the Senate. However, since the control that the Emperor held over the senate was absolute, the Senate acted as a vehicle through which the Emperor exercised his autocratic powers.

== Procedure ==
The first emperor, Augustus, inherited a Senate whose membership had been increased to 900 senators by his adoptive father, Julius Caesar. Augustus sought to reduce the size of the Senate, and did so through three revisions to the list of senators. By the time that these revisions had been completed, the Senate had been reduced to 600 members, and after this point, the size of the Senate was never again drastically altered. To reduce the size of the Senate, Augustus expelled senators who were of low birth, and then he reformed the rules which specified how an individual could become a senator. Under Augustus' reforms, a senator had to be a citizen of free birth, have not been convicted of any crimes under lex Julia de vi private, and have property worth at least 1,000,000 sesterces.

Under the Empire, as was the case during the late Republic, one could become a senator by being elected quaestor. Under the Empire, however, one could only stand for election to the Quaestorship if one was of senatorial rank, and to be of senatorial rank, one had to be the son of a senator. If an individual was not of senatorial rank, there were two ways for that individual to become a senator. Under the first method, the Emperor granted that individual the authority to stand for election to the Quaestorship, while under the second method, the Emperor appointed that individual to the Senate by issuing a decree (the adlectio).

Beginning in 9 BC, with the passage of Augustus' lex Julia de senatu habendo, an official list of Senators (the album senatorium) was maintained and revised each year. Individuals were added to the list if they had recently satisfied the requirements for entry into the Senate, and were removed from the list if they no longer satisfied the requirements necessary to maintain Senate membership. The list named each senator by order of rank. The Emperor always outranked all of his fellow senators and was followed by "Consuls" (the highest-ranking magistrate) and former Consuls, then by "Praetors" (the next highest ranking magistrate) and former Praetors, and so on. A senator's tenure in elective office was considered when determining rank, while Senators who had been elected to an office did not necessarily outrank Senators who had been appointed to that same office by the Emperor

Members of the senatorial order were distinguished by a broad reddish-purple stripe edging their togas – the formal dress of all Roman citizens.

Under the Empire, the power that the Emperor held over the Senate was absolute, which was due, in part, to the fact that the Emperor held office for life. During Senate meetings, the Emperor sat between the two Consuls, and usually acted as the presiding officer. Senators of the early Empire could ask extraneous questions or request that a certain action be taken by the Senate. Higher ranking senators spoke before lower ranking senators, although the Emperor could speak at any time. Besides the Emperor, Consuls, and Praetors could also preside over the Senate.

The Senate ordinarily met in the Curia Julia, usually on either the Kalends (the first day of the month), or the Ides (around the fifteenth day of the month), although scheduled meetings occurred more frequently in September and October. Other meetings were held on an ad hoc basis. Under Augustus, a quorum was set at 400 senators, although eventually excessive absenteeism forced the Senate to lower the number of senators necessary for a quorum, and, on some matters, to revoke the quorum rules altogether.

Most of the bills that came before the Senate were presented by the Emperor or his supporters in the body. In the early Principate, Augustus and Tiberius made conscious efforts to hide their influence on the body, lobbying in private instead of directly proposing legislation. Since no senator could stand for election to a magisterial office without the emperor's approval, senators usually did not vote against bills that had been presented by the emperor. If a senator disapproved of a bill, he usually showed his disapproval by not attending the Senate meeting on the day that the bill was to be voted on. Each emperor selected a quaestor to compile the proceedings of the Senate into a document (the Acta Senatus), which included proposed bills, official documents, and a summary of speeches that had been presented before the Senate. The document was archived, while parts of it were published (in a document called the Acta Diurna or "daily doings") and then distributed to the public.

According to the Historia Augusta (Elagabalus 4.2 and 12.3) emperor Elagabalus had his mother or grandmother take part in Senate proceedings. "And Elagabalus was the only one of all the emperors under whom a woman attended the Senate like a man, just as though she belonged to the senatorial order" (David Magie's translation). According to the same work, Elagabalus also established a women's senate called the senaculum, which enacted rules to be applied to matrons, regarding clothing, chariot riding, the wearing of jewelry, etc. (Elagabalus 4.3 and Aurelian 49.6). Before this, Agrippina the Younger, mother of Nero, had been listening to Senate proceedings, concealed behind a curtain, according to Tacitus (Annales, 13.5).

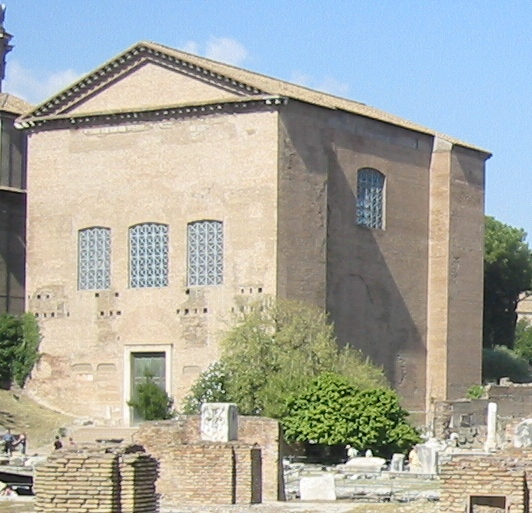
The Curia Julia in the Roman Forum, the seat of the imperial Senate

== Powers ==
While the Roman assemblies continued to meet after the founding of the Empire, their powers were all transferred to the Senate, and so senatorial decrees (senatus consulta) acquired the full force of law. The legislative powers of the Imperial Senate were principal of a financial and an administrative nature, although the senate did retain a range of powers over the provinces. The Senate could also regulate festivals and religious cults, grant special honors, excuse an individual (usually the Emperor) from legal liability, manage temples and public games, and even enact tax laws (but only with the acquiescence of the Emperor). However, it had no real authority over either the state religion or over public lands.

During the early Roman Empire, all judicial powers that had been held by the Roman assemblies were also transferred to the Senate. For example, the senate now held jurisdiction over criminal trials. In these cases, a consul presided, the senators constituted the jury, and the verdict was handed down in the form of a decree (senatus consultum), and, while a verdict could not be appealed, the Emperor could pardon a convicted individual through a veto. Each province that was under the jurisdiction of the Senate had its own court, and, upon the recommendation of a consul, decisions of these provincial courts could be appealed to the Senate.

In theory, the Senate elected new emperors, while in conjunction with the popular assemblies, it would then confer upon the new emperor his command powers (imperium). After an emperor had died or abdicated his office, the Senate would often deify him, although sometimes it would pass a decree (damnatio memoriae or "damnation from memory") which would attempt to cancel every trace of that emperor from the life of Rome, as if he had never existed. The emperor Tiberius transferred all electoral powers from the assemblies to the Senate, and, while theoretically, the senate elected new magistrates, the approval of the Emperor was always needed before an election could be finalized. Despite this fact, however, elections remained highly contested and vigorously fought.

Under Vespasian (69-79 AD) senators were accorded an increased role as senior officials of the Imperial household in Rome or as provincial rulers directly representing the emperor. At the same time, members of the Equestrian order were employed in administrative positions that earlier emperors had reserved for freedmen. In the case of the Senate this expanded responsibility ensured an increased opportunity for providing advice and exercising authority. At the end of the Flavian dynasty the Senate was able to choose Nerva as the new emperor – the first time under the Empire that such an initiative had been possible. However, after the death of Marcus Aurelius, the Senate became increasingly irrelevant, as Emperors become more hostile to its members and less frequently consulted it. By the Severan dynasty, the Senatorial class was also increasingly separated from the actual operations of government, which were increasingly taken over by equestrians and other members of the Imperial bureaucracy.

Around 300 AD, the Emperor Diocletian enacted a series of constitutional reforms. In one such reform, Diocletian asserted the right of the Emperor to take power without the theoretical consent of the Senate, thus depriving the Senate of its status as the ultimate depository of supreme power. Diocletian's reforms also ended whatever illusion had remained that the Senate had independent legislative, judicial, or electoral powers. The Senate did, however, retain its legislative powers over public games in Rome, and over the senatorial order. The Senate also retained the power to try treason cases, and to elect some magistrates, but only with the permission of the Emperor. In the final years of the Empire, the Senate would sometimes try to appoint their own emperor, such as in the case of Eugenius who was later defeated by forces loyal to Theodosius I. The Senate remained the last stronghold of the traditional Roman religion in the face of the spreading Christianity, and several times attempted to facilitate the return of the Altar of Victory, first removed by Constantius II, to the senatorial curia.

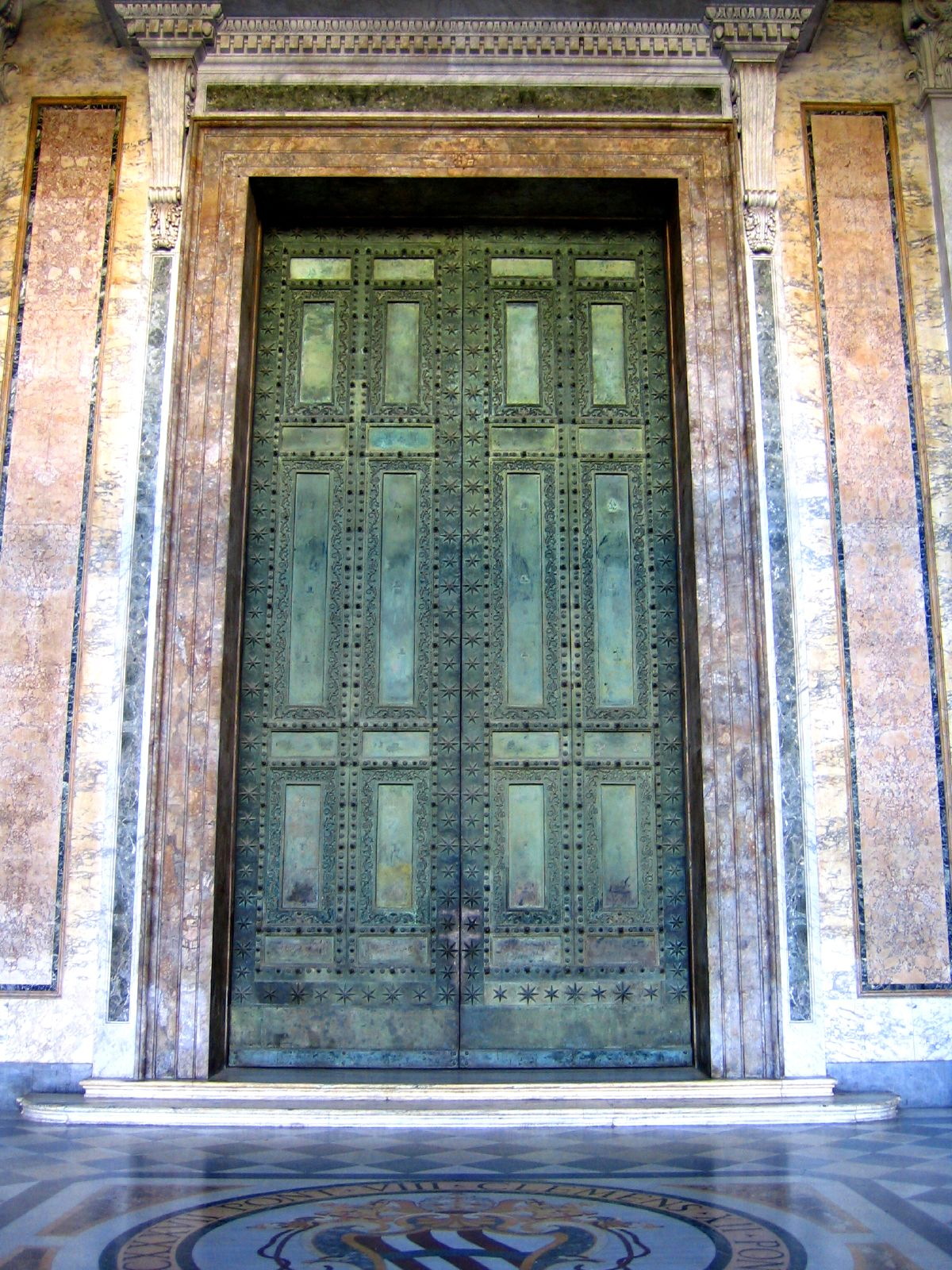
Bronze doors of the ancient Roman senate taken from the Roman Forum, restored and placed in 1660 in the Lateran Basilica.

== Post-Imperial period ==
After the fall of the Western Roman Empire, the Roman Senate continued to function under the barbarian chieftain Odoacer, and then under Theoderic the Great who founded the Ostrogothic Kingdom. The authority of the Senate rose considerably under barbarian leaders who sought to protect the institution. This period was characterized by the rise of prominent Roman senatorial families such as the Anicii, while the Senate's leader, the princeps senatus, often served as the right hand of the barbarian leader. It is known that the Senate installed Laurentius as antipope in 498 despite the fact that both King Theoderic the Great and Emperor Anastasius I Dicorus supported Pope Symmachus.

The peaceful co-existence of senatorial and barbarian rule continued until the Ostrogothic leader Theodahad began an uprising against Emperor Justinian I and took the senators as hostages. Several senators were executed in 552 as a revenge for the death of the Ostrogothic king Totila. After Rome was recaptured by the Imperial (Byzantine) army, the Senate was restored, but the institution (like classical Rome itself) had been mortally weakened by the long war between the Byzantines and the Ostrogoths. Many senators had been killed and many of those who had fled to the East chose to remain there thanks to favorable legislation passed by emperor Justinian, who however abolished virtually all senatorial offices in Italy. The importance of the Roman Senate thus declined rapidly. In 578 and again in 580, the Senate sent envoys to Constantinople who delivered 3000 pounds of gold as a gift to the new emperor Tiberius II Constantinus along with a plea for help against the Lombards who had invaded Italy ten years earlier. Pope Gregory I, in a sermon from 593 (Senatus deest, or.18), lamented the almost complete disappearance of the senatorial order and the decline of the prestigious institution. It is not clearly known when the Roman Senate disappeared in the West, but it is known from Gregorian register that the Senate acclaimed new statues of Emperor Phocas and Empress Leontia in 603. The institution must have ended by 630 when the Curia was transformed into a church by Pope Honorius I. The Byzantine Senate did continue to exist in the Eastern Roman Empire's capital Constantinople, however, having been instituted there during the reign of Constantine I, where it survived until at least the mid-14th century.

== See also ==
- Roman Kingdom
- Roman Republic
- Roman Empire
- Roman Law
- Plebeian Council
- Centuria
- Curia
- Roman consul
- Praetor
- Roman censor
- Quaestor
- Aedile
- Roman Dictator
- Master of the Horse
- Roman Senate
- Cursus honorum
- Byzantine Senate
- Pontifex Maximus
