= December 31 (Eastern Orthodox liturgics) =

Day in the Eastern Orthodox liturgical calendar

Eastern Orthodox liturgical calendar
December 30	December 31	January 1
December 31 O.S. ≍ January 13 N.S. December 31 N.S ≍ December 18 O.S.

An Eastern Orthodox cross

December 31 in Eastern Orthodox liturgical calendars is a feast day and a day of commemoration of saints and martyrs. Although some Orthodox churches use the Revised Julian Calendar and others use the traditional Julian calendar, the fixed commemorations for their respective December 31 are broadly the same, no matter which calendar is used. (Note: Despite the dates being the same, the days to which they refer typically differ by 13 days. The notation Old Style or O.S. is sometimes used to indicate a date in the traditional Julian Calendar (the "Old Calendar"). The notation New Style or N.S. indicates a date in the Revised Julian calendar (the "New Calendar").)

== Feasts ==
- Apodosis of the Nativity of Christ (Note: Materials for the Leavetaking of the Nativity are taken from the service of the Feast day itself in the Menaion. The Scripture readings at Liturgy, however, are of the day, not of the Feast. The Prokeimenon, Alleluia verses, and Communion hymn are all of the Feast.)

== Saints ==
- Righteous Abgar V, King of Osroene (c. 50)
- Holy Ten Virgin Martyrs of Nicomedia, who had their eyes put out and their sides run through (c. 286 – 305)
- Martyr Olympiodora, who was burned alive.
- Martyr Busiris, martyred by women with knitting needles.
- Martyr Nemes (Nemo), by the sword.
- Martyr Gaudentius.
- Saint Hermes of Dunonia, exorcist (4th century)
- Hieromartyr Zoticus (Zotikos) the Priest of Constantinople, Feeder and Guardian of Orphans, Cherisher of the Poor and Servant of Lepers (c. 340) (Note: "St. Zoticus, Roman priest, who went to Constantinople, and took upon himself the care of orphans.") (see also December 30 - Russian)
- Saint Anysius, Bishop of Thessaloniki (c. 407) (see also December 30 - Roman)
- Venerable Melania the Younger, Nun of Rome (439) (Note: Melania the Younger and Pinian: Melania was the granddaughter of St. Melania the Elder. Born in Rome, she married a man called Pinian (Valerius Pinianus). They had two children who died young. About the year 410 they left Rome, the former entering a monastery and the latter a convent in Jerusalem.)
- Venerable Gelasius, Monk (Abba) of Palestine, who reposed in peace.
- Venerable Gaius, Monk, who died in peace.
- Venerable Sabiana, Abbess of Samtskhe Convent (11th century)

== Pre-Schism Western saints ==
- Saint Columba of Sens (273) (Note: Born in Spain, she left her country to avoid being denounced as a Christian. She went to France with other Spanish Christians, but all of them were martyred near Meaux under Aurelian. Her shrine was in Sens.)
- Martyrs of Catania, in Sicily:
  - Stephen, Pontian, Attalus, Fabian, Cornelius, Sextus, Flos, Quintian, Minervinus and Simplician, early martyrs in Catania in Sicily.
- Martyrs Donata, Paulina, Rustica (Rogata), Nominanda (Dominanda), Serotina, Hilaria and Companions (Note: A group of Roman women martyred in one of the early persecutions. Their relics were enshrined in the catacombs of the Via Salaria.)
- Hieromartyrs Sabinian and Potentian (c. 303) (Note: Sabinian is honoured as the first Bishop of Sens in France. Potentian was perhaps his successor. Both were martyred.)
- Saint Silvester I, Pope of Rome (335) (Note: Silvester came from Rome and served the Church as Pope from 314 to 335, helping convert St. Constantine. Most of his relics are enshrined in San Silvestro in Capite in Rome.) (see also January 2 - in the East)
- Saint Valerius Pinianus (Apinianus), husband of Saint Melania the Younger (432)
- Saint Barbatianus (Barbatian), Priest and Confessor, at Ravenna (5th century) (Note: A priest from Antioch who went to Rome and there attracted the attention of the Empress, Placidia Augusta, through his wise counsel. She encouraged him to live in Ravenna in Italy near the imperial court, where a monastery was built.)
- Saint Marius Aventicensis, Bishop of Aventicum (596)
- Saint Fránquila (Frankila, Franklin), first abbot of the Monastery of San Salvador de Celanova, following the Rule of Saint Benedict (959) (Note: References to Abbot Fránquila (also spelled Frankila) are limited and highly specific to early medieval Galician history. Fránquila's most prominent mention in hagiographic literature is as a secondary figure in the life of St. Rudesind. When St. Rudesind founded the Monastery of San Salvador de Celanova around 936, he brought a community of monks over from the older, established Monastery of Santo Estevo de Ribas de Sil. Fránquila was one of those imported monks and was personally appointed by St. Rudesind to serve as Celanova's very first abbot.)
- Saint Peter of Subiaco (1003) (Note: The twenty-second Abbot of Subiaco in Italy. For defending his monastery, he was blinded and died in prison.)

== Post-Schism Orthodox saints ==
- Blessed Theophylact, Archbishop of Ochrid (c. 1126)
- Saint George Macheromenos the Wonderworker, "the stabbed" (c. 14th century) (Note: He is unknown in the Synaxaria, however he is venerated as a local Saint of the Church of Cyprus (Patmos Codex 266).)
- Saint Petro Mohyla (Peter Mogila), Metropolitan of Kiev, Galicia and all Rus, Exarch of the Ecumenical Patriarchate (1646) (Note: KONDAK TO ST. PETRO MOHYLA, TONE 8: "Your were shown to be the beacon of the Kyivan Metropolia, a zealot of piety and patristic teachings, O father and hierarch Petro. Fellow struggler of venerable Job in defense of the Orthodox Church, you fearlessly armed yourself against the devil's wiles. Therefore, be not silent now in your prayers to the Lord for us, so that our souls may be saved.") (see also: December 6 - Glorification)
- Venerable Cyriacus of Bisericani Monastery, Romania (1660)
- Venerable Cyriacus of Tazlau Monastery, Romania (1660)

=== New martyrs and confessors ===
- New Hieromartyr Michael Berezin, Priest (1937)
- New Martyr Peter Troitsky, Reader (1938)
- New Hieroconfessor Dositheus Vasich, Metropolitan of Zagreb (1945) (Note: See also: (in Russian): Досифей (Васич).)

== Other commemorations ==
- Unfading Flower Icon of the Mother of God at Ardatov (see also April 3)
- Glorification (2015) of Saint Paisios of Mount Athos (1994) (O.S.)

== Icon gallery ==
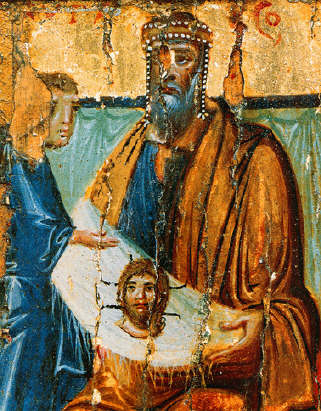
Righteous Abgar V, King of Osroene.

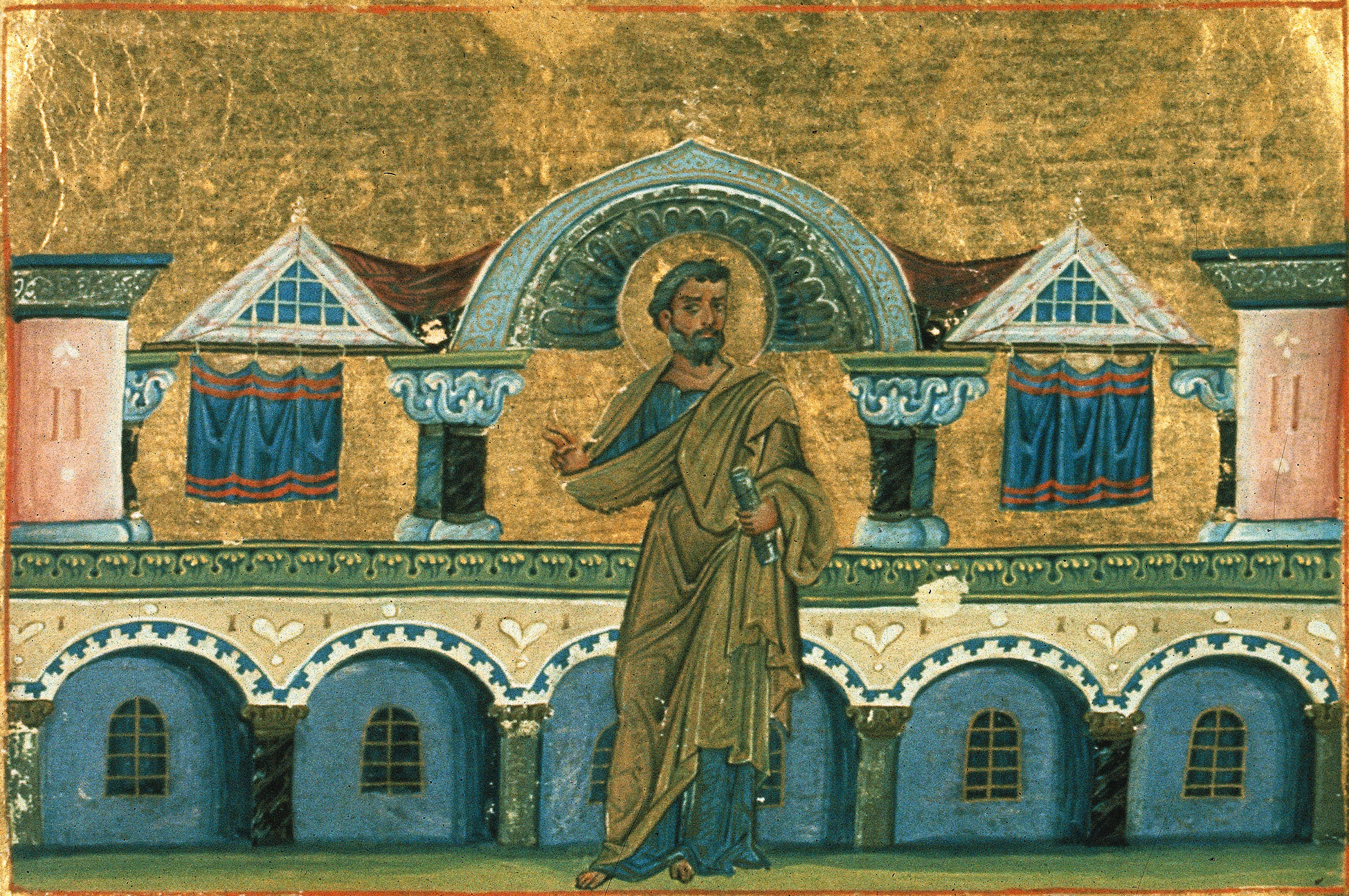
Hieromartyr Zoticus the Priest, of Constantinople, Guardian of Orphans.
(Menologion of Basil II, 10th century).

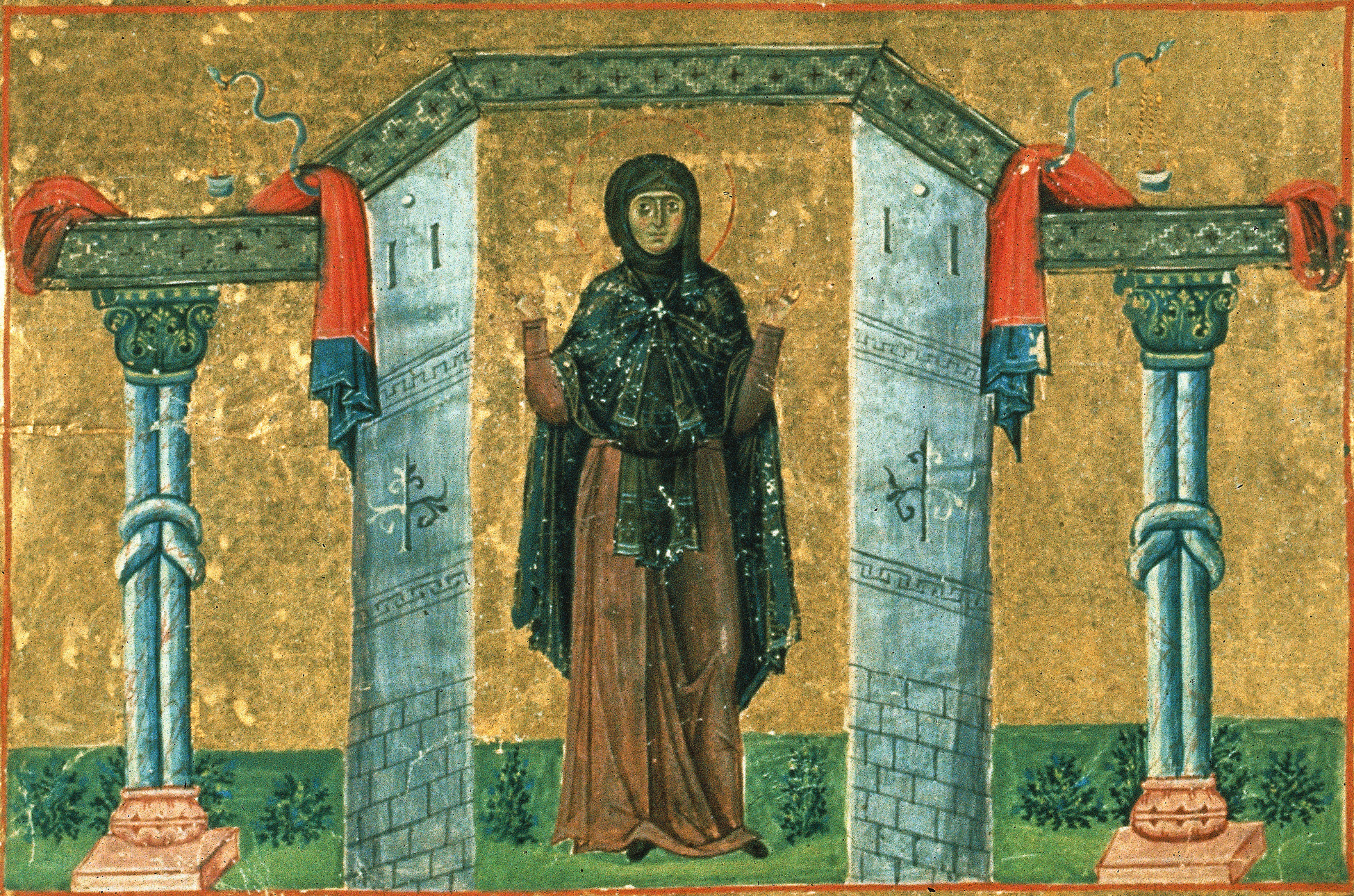
Venerable Melania the Younger, Nun of Rome.
(Menologion of Basil II, 10th century).

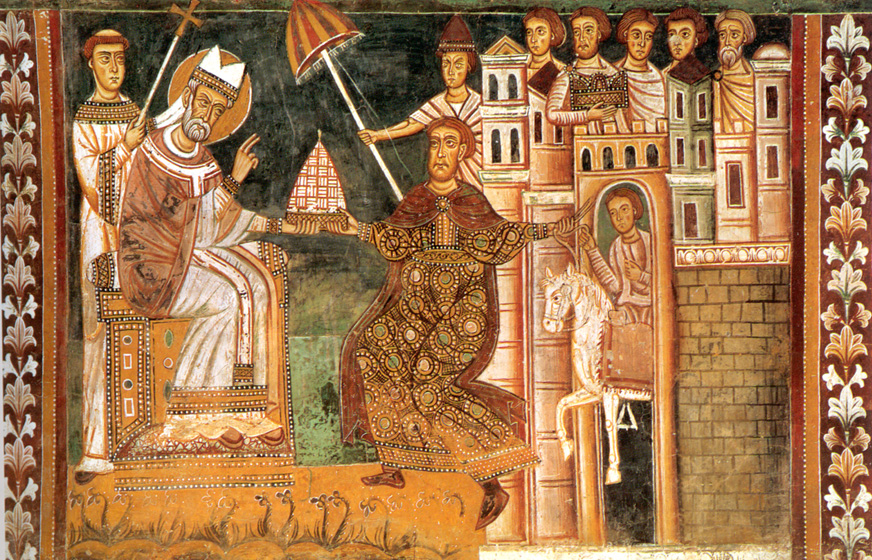
Pope St. Sylvester I and Emperor Constantine.

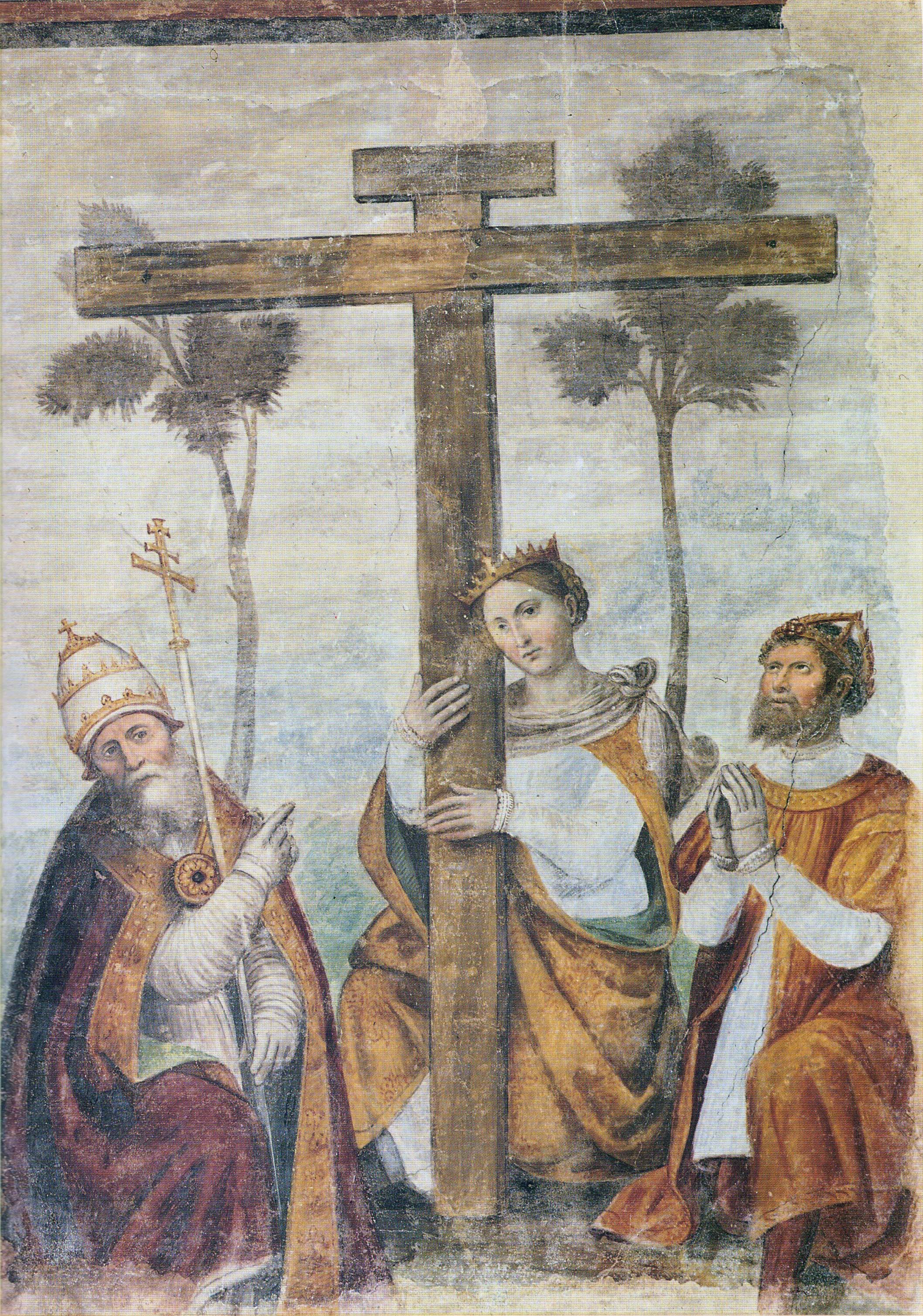
Adoration of the Cross by Pope St. Sylvester I, Empress Helena and Emperor Constantine.

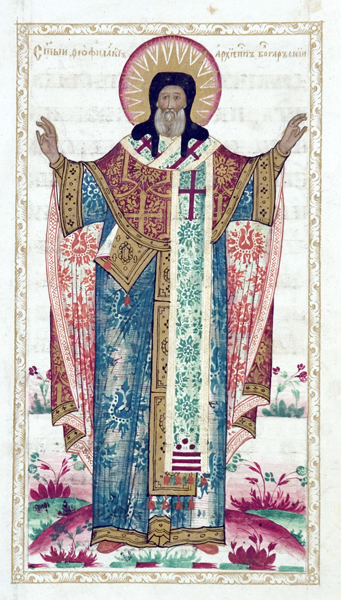
Saint Theophylactus of Ohrid.

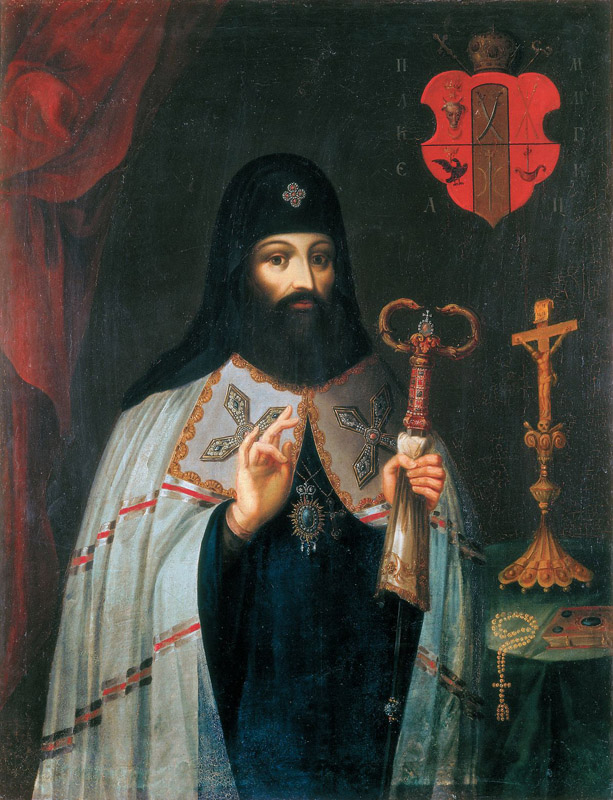
St. Peter (Mogila), Metropolitan of Kiev and Galica, Defender of the Orthodox faithful against subjugation to the Roman Papacy ('Unia').

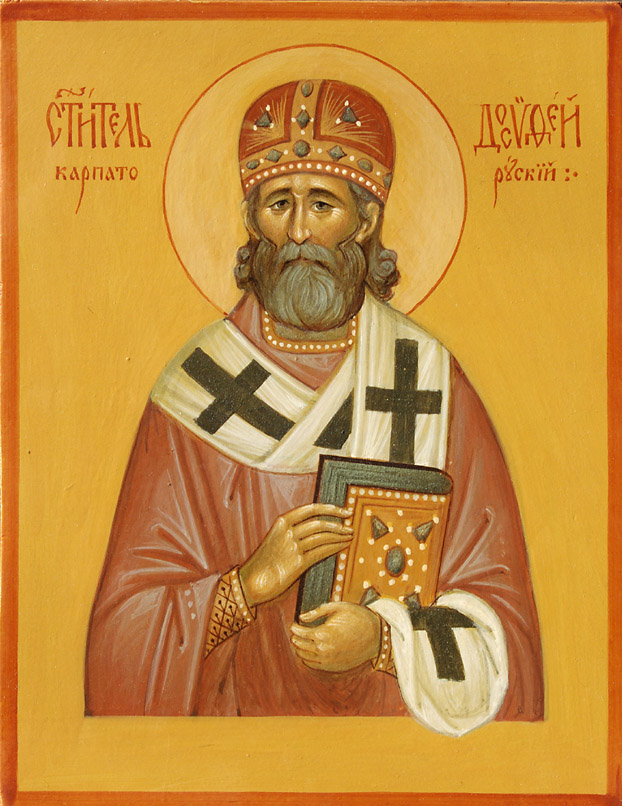
New Hieroconfessor Dositheus (Vasich), Metropolitan of Zagreb.

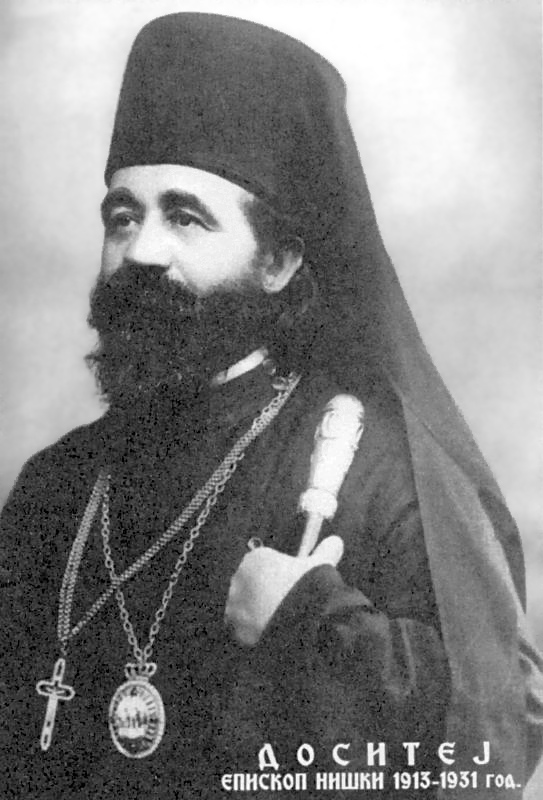
New Hieroconfessor Dositheus (Vasich), Metropolitan of Zagreb.

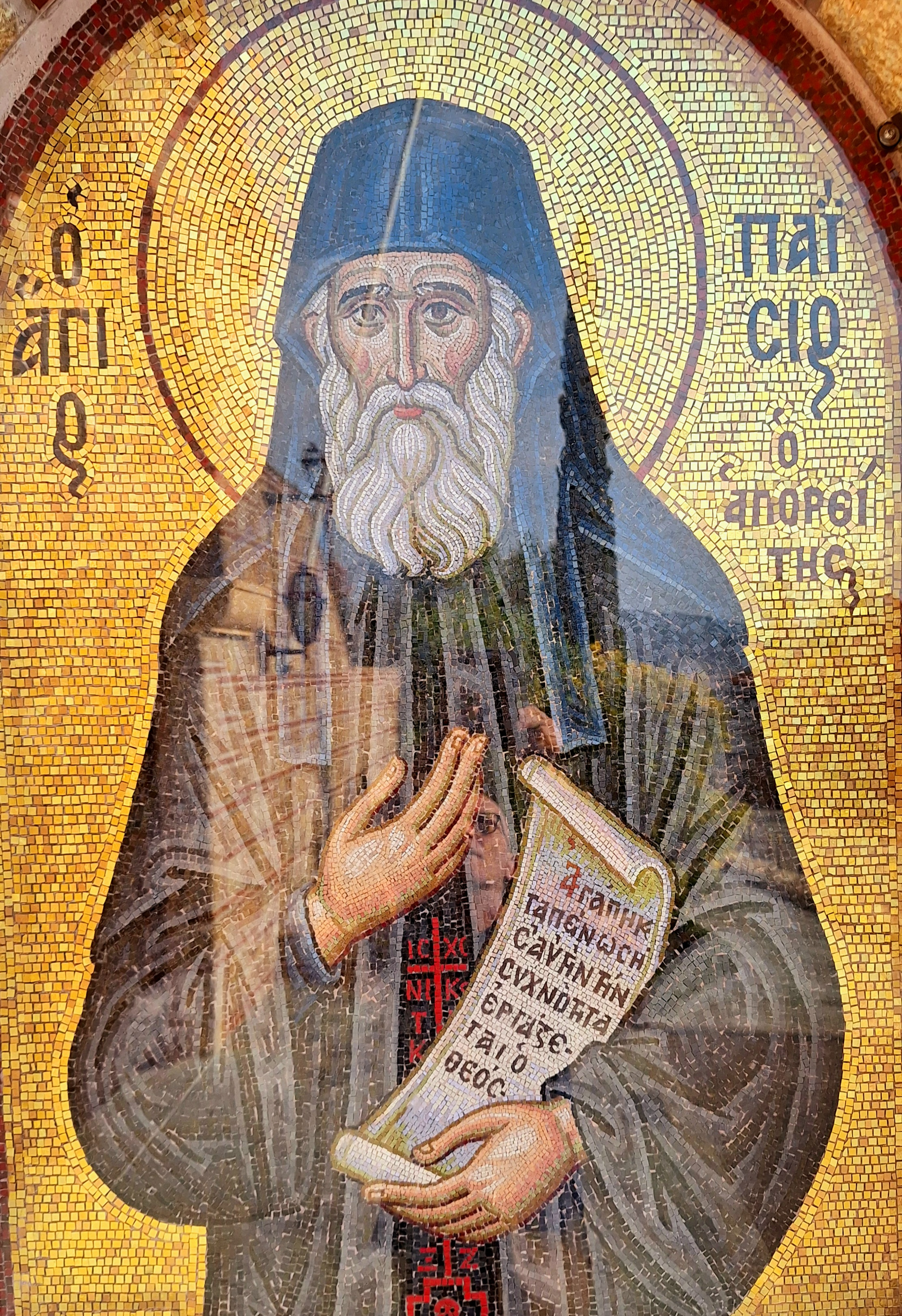
St. Paisios of Mount Athos.

== Sources ==
- December 31/January 13. Orthodox Calendar (PRAVOSLAVIE.RU).
- January 13 / December 31. HOLY TRINITY RUSSIAN ORTHODOX CHURCH (A parish of the Patriarchate of Moscow).
- December 31. OCA - The Lives of the Saints.
- The Autonomous Orthodox Metropolia of Western Europe and the Americas (ROCOR). St. Hilarion Calendar of Saints for the year of our Lord 2004. St. Hilarion Press (Austin, TX). p. 4.
- December 31. Latin Saints of the Orthodox Patriarchate of Rome.
- The Roman Martyrology. Transl. by the Archbishop of Baltimore. Last Edition, According to the Copy Printed at Rome in 1914. Revised Edition, with the Imprimatur of His Eminence Cardinal Gibbons. Baltimore: John Murphy Company, 1916. pp. 402–403.

Greek Sources

- Great Synaxaristes: (in Greek) 31 ΔΕΚΕΜΒΡΙΟΥ. ΜΕΓΑΣ ΣΥΝΑΞΑΡΙΣΤΗΣ.
- (in Greek) Συναξαριστής. 31 Δεκεμβρίου. ECCLESIA.GR. (H ΕΚΚΛΗΣΙΑ ΤΗΣ ΕΛΛΑΔΟΣ).

Russian Sources

- (in Russian) 13 января (31 декабря). Православная Энциклопедия под редакцией Патриарха Московского и всея Руси Кирилла (электронная версия). (Orthodox Encyclopedia - Pravenc.ru).
- (in Russian) 31 декабря (ст.ст.) 13 января 2015 (нов. ст.). Русская Православная Церковь Отдел внешних церковных связей. (DECR).
