= Gabinius Barbarus Pompeianus =

Gabinius Barbarus Pompeianus (died in Rome, February 409 AD) was a politician of the Western Roman Empire, praefectus urbi of Rome during the first siege of Alaric I.

Pompeianus owned an estate that bounded with Quintus Aurelius Symmachus' in Baiae: the two of them disputed the exact definition of the boundaries until 398, when Pompeianus sold his property. A letter received by Pompeianus from Symmachus in 400 has been preserved.

Between 400 and 401 he was proconsul of Africa Province.

Between the end of 408 and the beginning of 409 he was praefectus urbi of Rome. During this time, Alaric I besieged Rome for the first time. Pompeianus proposed to ask the pagan gods to protect the city. For this reason it is often assumed that he was a pagan, but Zosimus calls him a Christian. It was probably he who proposed to confiscate the properties of Valerius Pinianus and his wife Melania the Younger; but before the Roman Senate could discuss this proposal, Pompeianus was killed in the Roman Forum by an angry mob, which had rioted because of the shortage of food caused by the siege.

Pompeianus may be the villain of the anonymous Latin poem Carmen contra paganos, which criticizes an unnamed prefect for restoring pagan rites in Rome.

== Sources ==
- Codex Theodosianus, several laws
- CIL VIII, 969
- Quintus Aurelius Symmachus, Letters, IX.8
- Sozomen, IX.2
- Vita Melaniae 19 (Greek version), II.1 (Latin version)
- Zosimus, V.41.1-2
- "Gabinius Barbarus Pompeianus 2", Prosopography of the Later Roman Empire, Volume 2.

Political offices
Preceded by Nicomachus Flavianus	Praefectus urbi of Rome; 408-409	Succeeded by Priscus Attalus
Preceded by Apollodorus	Proconsul of Africa; 400-401	Succeeded by Marius Vindicius or Helpidius
