= Albina (religious patron) =

Roman religious patron

Albina (died c. AD 431) was a late Roman religious patron, correspondent of St Augustine and was the mother of Melania the Younger.

== Biography ==
Albina was born in Nola, possibly during the AD 360s based on the known date of birth of her daughter Melania in 383. She was from a wealthy Roman family, Ceionia gens: her father was Ceionius Rufius Albinus and her brother was Rufius Antonius Agrypnius Volusianus. Her aunt was Avita, mother of Eunomia. She married Publicola and had a daughter who became the Christian Saint and Desert Mother, Melania the Younger. Melania married her cousin Valerius Pinianus c. 396.

Albina went with Melania and Pinnanius to Campania and Sicily after Publicola's death prior to 408. Around 410, the family moved to near Thagaste, where they stayed for seven years. In 417, Albina accompanied Melania to Palestine and remained there until her death fourteen years later in 431.

== Religious politics ==
It is clear from surviving correspondence that Albina was seen as an influential woman in her own right, beyond association with her daughter.

=== Correspondence with Augustine of Hippo ===
Her most notable correspondence was with Augustine of Hippo, to whom she wrote over sixty-nine letters. In his first letter to Albina, her daughter and son-in-law, Augustine regrets that he cannot travel to see them and misses their "vehement light". It's clear that Albina is an important part of the religious network in the early fifth century, as she is mentioned in letters, such as Letter 125 from Augustine to Alypius. Albina alone was addressed by Augustine in Letter 126, which reports on the aftermath of the incident at Thagaste, which is now known as the Pinian Affair.

==== Pinian Affair ====
Albina was involved in an incident, whilst they were in Thagaste. Albina wrote to Augustine asking him to visit them, but he would not leave his church. As a result, Albina, Melania and Pinnianus travelled to him. Once there, the congregation demanded that Pinnianus be ordained and the congregation became frenzied. Augustine threatened that he would leave as bishop. The episode shows how volatile communities could be.

==== Pelagian Heresy ====
Augustine wrote addressed the letter refuting Pelagianism to Albina and her family. Historian Peter Brown suggested that one of the reasons Augustine delayed attacking Pelagius until c.415 was because of the closeness of Albina and her family with him.

=== Friendship with Paulinus of Nola ===
Albina was discussed by Paulinus of Nola, in Poem 21, dating to around 407. He describes her as a leader of "the column of the singing chorus" with her aunt, Avita, and his wife Therasia.

=== Other Mentions in Ancient Literature ===
Augustine dedicated his book De Gratia Christi et de Peccato Originali to her, Melania and Pinianus. Jerome also wrote to Augustine and Aypius in 419 in Letter 202, discussing various church matters and sending greetings to the leader from Albina.
