= Alypius =

Alypius may refer to:

- Alypius of Antioch, vicarius of Roman Britain, probably in the late 350s
- Alypius of Alexandria, music theorist, c. 360
- Alypius of Byzantium (died 169), bishop of Byzantium
- Alypius of Constantinople (fl. 430), Byzantine priest
- Alypius the Stylite (died 640), ascetic saint and monastic founder
- Alypius of Thagaste (died after 416), Catholic saint and bishop in 394
- Alypius (icon painter) (1851–1901)

== See also ==
- Alypus, ancient Greek sculptor
