= Melania the Younger =

Christian saint and ascetic

Saint Melania the Younger
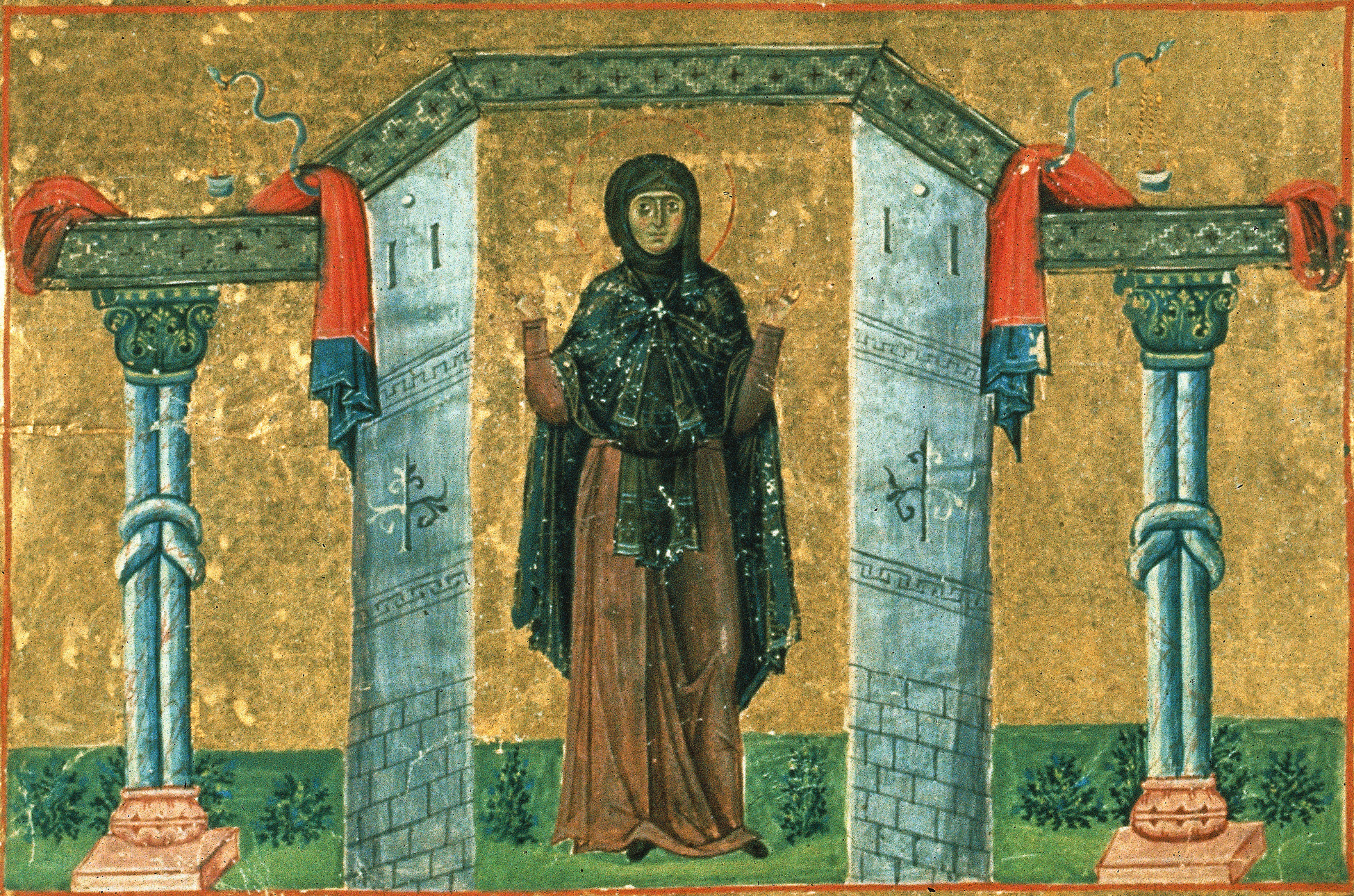
- Miniature from the Menologion of Basil II
- Born: c. 383; Rome, Roman Empire
- Died: 31 December 439 (aged 55-56); Jerusalem, Byzantine Empire
- Venerated in: Roman Catholic Church, Orthodox Church, Eastern Catholic Churches
- Feast: 31 December

Melania the Younger (c. 383 – 31 December 439) is a Christian saint, Desert Mother, and ascetic who lived during the reign of Emperor Honorius, son of Theodosius I. She is the paternal granddaughter of Melania the Elder.

The Feast of Melania the Younger is held on 31 December (the Julian calendar's 31 December falls on 13 January on the Gregorian calendar).

== Life ==
=== Rome ===
Melania was the only child of the rich and powerful Valerius Publicola (son of Melania the Elder) and his wife Caeionia Albina, both Christians, of the senatorial Valeria gens family of ancient lineage which was the pride of Rome. Her paternal and maternal relatives had held the highest offices of state with great distinction during the whole of the century, and Melania could even boast of a long line of imperial blood, most recently through Valerius Romulus (r. 308-309).

She was married to her paternal cousin, Valerius Pinianus, at the age of fourteen despite her protests. The 5th-century Melaniae Junioris Vita ("Life of Melania the Younger") says:

"It was settled that the young couple, scarcely more than children, should reside with Publicola in his palace on the Coelian Hill. This was the cause of much suffering to Melania. Her fervour daily increased, and with it her horror of a life of luxury and sensual ease. Living constantly under her father's watchful eye, she was obliged to comply with his wishes, and to sustain the honour of the family by conforming to all the usages of Roman society. She had to dress with all the splendour befitting a matron of exalted rank, and to make her appearance in public surrounded with much state. All this was so repugnant to the young wife that it caused her real torture. She sought by the most ingenious devices to find an outlet for her spirit of penance and expiation."

Melania often pleaded for Pinianus to conform to asceticism so she could maintain her purity for the lord, but Pinianus desired to rather continue the family line. Melania's husband wanted two children, yet they both did not survive. These deaths took a toll on the married couple and encouraged the choice of asceticism. This was especially difficult due to Roman societal standards and the familial patrimony present in Melania and Piniasus's life. Knowing that Melania wanted to practice a celibate lifestyle, her father, near death, asked for forgiveness for pushing the unwanted marriage years prior. Once her father passed, She and her husband embraced Christian asceticism and maintained a celibate life thereafter. As the sole heiress to her father and paternal grandfather, she inherited their wealth and enormous estates on the death of Publicola after 7 years of marriage.

Melania decided to leave the palace for one of her villas in Spring 404. She was encouraged by her grandmother, Melania the Elder, who had also travelled from Jerusalem and held strong ascetic beliefs. Ascetics, and early Christian leaders believed that denying oneself worldly pleasures and desires was essential for spiritual growth and closeness to God.Her dislike of rich apparel had caused her suffering during her father's life, yet now led her to give away her silken robes as church altarcloths, including her gold ornaments, and everything that was rich and costly in her wardrobe. She demonstrated no desire of worldly possessions by wearing a garment of cheap, coarse wool, and fashioned rather to hide and disfigure her womanly form. She took a great number of poor families and slaves with her to her villa, whom she treated as brothers and sisters. Such actions were the result of asceticism.

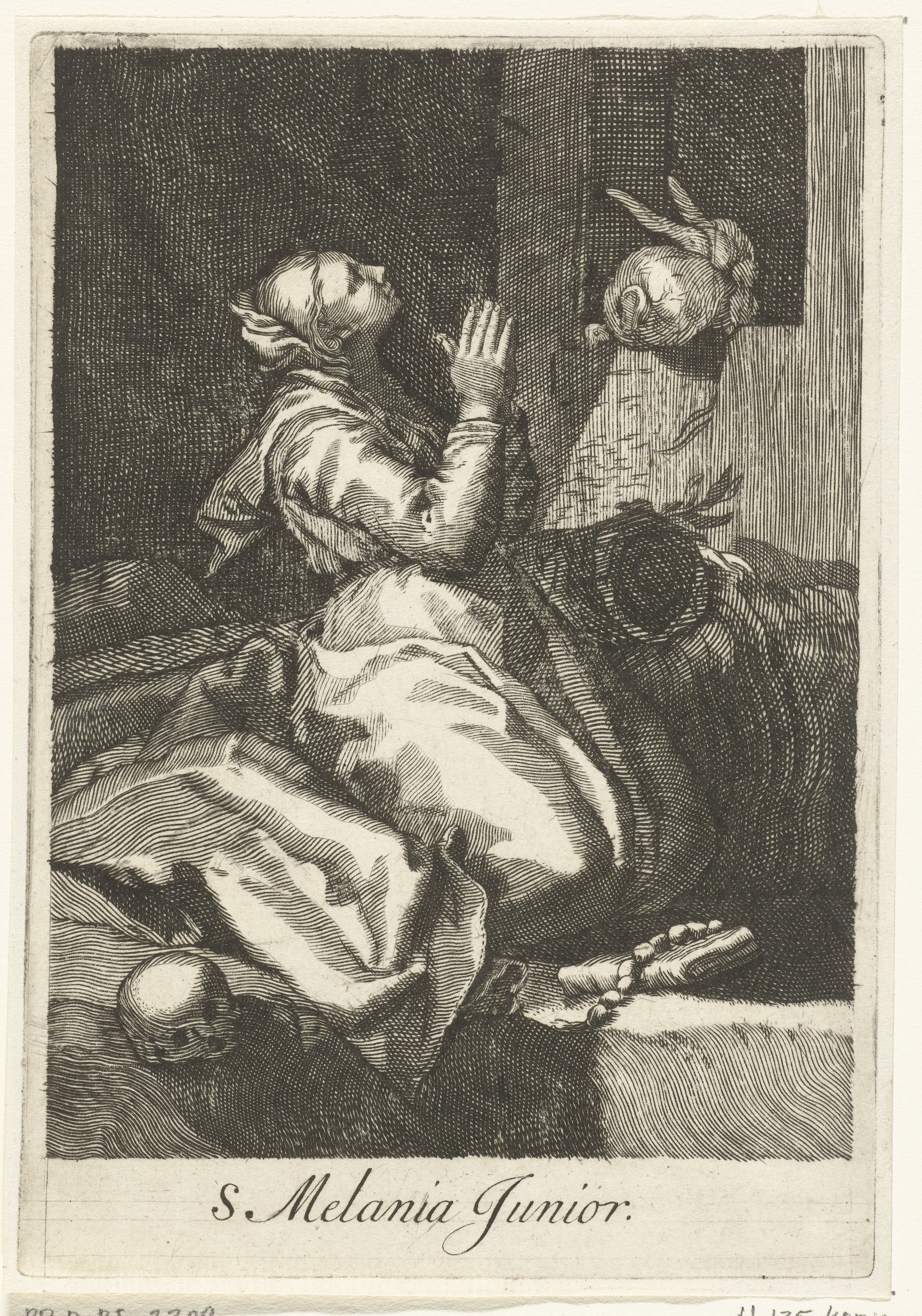
Saint Melania the Younger, Sacra Eremus Ascetriarum

The villa of the Valerii was supposedly of enormous size, as it was large enough to lodge the immense number of people whom Melania took with her from Rome. This, as we gather from bishop Palladius, consisted of fifteen eunuchs, sixty young girls who were vowed to virginity, other free-born women, slaves, and more than thirty families who had followed Pinianus in his new mode of life. But in addition to these regular guests, Melania's country house afforded hospitality to the pilgrims to Rome, especially the numerous deputations of bishops and priests who were received with every mark of honour and respect in the latter end of 404 and the beginning of 405, to plead the cause of John Chrysostom with Pope Innocent I. She dispensed lavish hospitality and spared no expense in the entertainment of her guests. Palladius speaks thankfully of the respectful welcome with which he was given during his sojourn, and of the large sum of money presented to him on his departure in February 406.

She decided to dispose of her vast estates and give the proceeds to ecclesiastical institutions and to the poor. This caused surprise and contempt amongst the Roman aristocracy who regarded the couple as lunatics. Some of their relatives considered that they now had an opportunity to enrich themselves extravagantly by taking advantage of the simplicity and inexperience of the couple. Melania's appeal to "Queen" Serena and Emperor Honorius led him to order every province that their possessions should be sold at the responsibility of the governors and public administrators, and that they be responsible for the remittance of the price to the couple.

The sale of such enormous estates inevitably took several years to complete as even the smallest of Melania's properties yielded an income of abundant amount. Part of their estates remained unsold at the end of 408 due to the invasion of the Goths and siege of Rome. Their opponents contrived to take advantage of the critical state of affairs, with the secret co-operation of the senate, by confiscating the remaining estates to the Treasury. They were supported in their plot by the prefect, Pompeianus, and the bill of confiscation had already been drafted. However, on the day when it was to be proclaimed by the prefect, the people rose in rebellion due to the shortage of bread. They seized Pompeianus, dragged him through the streets, and put him to death in the centre of the city.

Not even the wealthiest Roman patricians had enough cash to buy Melania's properties. The eventual purchasers were unable to pay the full price at once, so the owners were obliged to accept promissory notes. Melania's palace on the Caelian Hill, which she was the most anxious to dispose of, was magnificent and contained an accumulation of riches so great that it was impossible to find a purchaser. It remained unsold, and in 410, after being pillaged by Alaric's barbarian hordes and partly destroyed by fire, it was given away for nothing.

=== Sicily and Africa ===
Melania and Pinianus left Rome in 408 with her mother Albina and Rufinus of Aquileia, an old friend of the family, to live a monastic life near Messina (Sicily) for two years. They resided in the magnificent villa (probably Pistunina) that they owned on the western shore of the straits, opposite Reggio Calabria, surrounded beautifully by both sea and land.

Meanwhile Melania was occupied in disposing of her remaining property, the proceeds of which she distributed in alms and other donations. After the taking of Rome by Alaric I, the invaders marched upon Southern Italy, and destroyed Reggio. Melania witnessed the fires from across the straits.

Fear of the invaders drove Melania to seek a safer refuge. Africa was regarded as a safe haven by many Roman families who had already emigrated to Carthage. Having sold many of her possessions in Italy and Sicily and after the death of Rufinus in 410, they decided to travel to Africa. Before true departure, they attempted to visit Paulinus of Nola, but according to Gerontius of Jerusalem, a storm forced the ship to an unnamed island (probably Lipari) that had been ravaged by pirates who held inhabitants for ransom. Melania ransomed the islanders with her own money. Finally, they continued directly to Africa, where they befriended the great Augustine of Hippo and devoted themselves to a life of piety and charitable works.

Rather than in a city such as Carthage or Hippo, they chose to live in relative calm at their estate, near Tagaste in present Algeria. The estate was of such extent and importance as to include two episcopal sees, one belonging to the Catholic Church, the other to the Donatists. Some of the rooms of the villa were "filled with gold". Alypius was the famous bishop there with whom they became friends and had close relations with Paulinus and Augustine. Alypus had helped establish Augustine's first monastery in Africa. The church in Tagaste had been very poor but Melania furnished it with gold and silver cups, and with altar-cloths richly embroidered in gold and thickly sewn with pearls. She endowed this church with extensive property including a large part of the town itself. On the advice of the principal bishops Augustine, Alypius, and Aurelius of Carthage, she was also generous to the other churches and monasteries in Africa She assigned a regular income to make them independent of precarious alms-giving.

They stayed for seven years and founded a convent for the consecrated virgins who were once her slaves, yet treated as her sisters. Melania became Mother Superior, and also founded a cloister of which Pinianus took charge.

In the so-called Pinain affair, Melania's mother Albina wrote to Augustine asking him to visit them, but he would not leave his church. As a result, Albina, Alypus, Melania and Pinianus travelled to him in Hippo. Once there, the frenzied congregation demanded that Pinianus be ordained as priest of Hippo and forced him to swear that he would remain there. Augustine threatened that he would leave as bishop.

She practiced severe penance and wore haircloth, and at night she snatched brief rest on the hard ground as her bed. Her diet consisted of herbs or vegetables prepared with a little oil.

=== Palestine ===
In 417, they travelled to Palestine by way of Alexandria. In Palestine, they lived in a hermitage near the Mount of Olives, where Melania founded a second convent. After the death of Pinianus c. 420, Melania built a cloister for men, and a church, where she spent the remainder of her life.

=== Properties ===
Melania had "vast domains in Sicily" and also held land in Britain which she disposed of only a year or two before the Roman legions were withdrawn. She also owned grand estates in Iberia, Africa, Numidia, Mauretania and Italy. Gerontius describes her estate in Sicily as follows:

"On one side lay the sea and on the other some woodland containing a variety of animals and game, so that when she was bathing in the pool she could see ships passing by and game animals in the woods... the property [also] included sixty large houses, each of them with four hundred agricultural slaves."

== Legacy ==
Today, the town of Sainte-Mélanie in Canada is named in her honour.

== Hagiography ==
An account of Melania's pursuit of the ascetic life survives in a hagiography or biography, written by Gerontius c. 452.

Further, there is an account of her life by Palladius (d. A.D. 431) as well.

== Ancestry ==
Ancestors of Melania the Younger

16. Lucius Valerius Maximus Basilius (Note: Valerius Maximus Basilius was a descendant of Octavia the Younger, through her granddaughter Valeria Messallia (daughter of Claudia Marcella the Younger).)
8. Lucius Valerius Maximus Basilius
4. Valerius Maximus Basilius
2. Valerius Publicola
5. Melania the Elder
1. Melania the Younger
24. Caeionius Varus
12. Gaius Caeionius Rufius Volusianus
6. Gaius Caeionius Rufius Albinus
13. Nummia Albina
3. Caeionia Albina
7. Lampadia

== See also ==
- Evagrius Ponticus
- Jerome
- Rufius Antonius Agrypnius Volusianus

== Sources ==
- White, Carolinne, ed. (2010). Lives of Roman Christian Women. Penguin Books Limited. ISBN 978-0-14-194337-4.
