= Carmen contra paganos =

Latin poem

The Carmen contra paganos ("Song against the pagans"), also called the Carmen adversus Flavianum ("Song against Flavian"), is an anonymous 4th- or 5th-century Latin poem in 122 hexameters condemning a brief restoration of paganism at Rome.

The Carmen (CPL 1431) survives in only one manuscript, Parisian Cod. Lat. 8084, a copy of the works of the Roman Christian poet Prudentius. It is found on folios 156^{r}–158^{v}. It is not a work of high calibre. Its Latin is difficult to parse and often ungrammatical. Its prosody is often unmetrical. Its anti-pagan theme and tone are similar to that of the Carmen ad Antonium. It provides early evidence for the Christian reception of Virgil.

The Carmen is written from a Christian perspective. It describes how an unnamed prefect (either a praefectus urbi or a praefectus praetorio) restored pagan practices at Rome, which offended God, who duly brought about his death. Theodor Mommsen identified the prefect with Virius Nicomachus Flavianus, who killed himself in 394 when the victory which his pagan sacrifices were supposed to secure failed to happen at the Battle of the Frigidus. On the basis of this identification, Mommsen published the poem under the name Carmen adversus Flavianum. An alternative theory identifies the patriarch of the Carmen with Gabinius Barbarus Pompeianus, who was prefect at Rome when Alaric besieged the city in 408–09. In response to the Gothic threat, Pompeianus permitted pagan rites to be celebrated, but he was lynched by a mob during a riot over food.

The author of the Carmen is unknown. François Dolbeau suggested that it might have been Damasus I, who was pope between 366 and 384. This theory is incompatible with either of the proposed identifications of the prefect above. It is consistent with the prefect being Vettius Agorius Praetextatus, who died in 384. This sets the poem in the time of the pagan reaction led by Quintus Aurelius Symmachus.
