= Sabiana =

- Born: 10th century Georgia
- Died: 11th century Meskheti
- Occupation: Christian nun

Sabiana (in Georgian: ღირსი საბიანა), also known as Sabiana of Samtskhe, was a Georgian nun, saint, and venerable figure from the 10th-11th centuries. She spent most of her life and work in the monastery she led as hegumen, located in the region of Samtskhe.

Her memory is commemorated on 31 December in the Eastern Orthodox Church.

== Biography ==
According to her Eastern Orthodox hagiographies, she was born in the 10th century in Georgia. She is believed to have been the hegumen of a monastery in the Samtskhe region and took on the responsibility of teaching the novices who joined the monastery. Her most famous disciple was George the Hagiorite, another Eastern Orthodox saint and future scholar of the Monastic community of Mount Athos. Sabiana is said to have been his teacher for three years, after which he left the monastery to pursue a monastic career elsewhere. Before becoming his mentor, she is said to have taken in and taught George of Athos's sister, Tekla. According to hagiographical accounts, she raised her "as her own daughter".

== Legacy ==
Her memory is commemorated on 31 December in the Eastern Orthodox Church with the title of venerable.
