= Alypius (icon painter) =

Russian icon painter, hieromonk of Valaam Monastery

Hierodeacon Alipiy
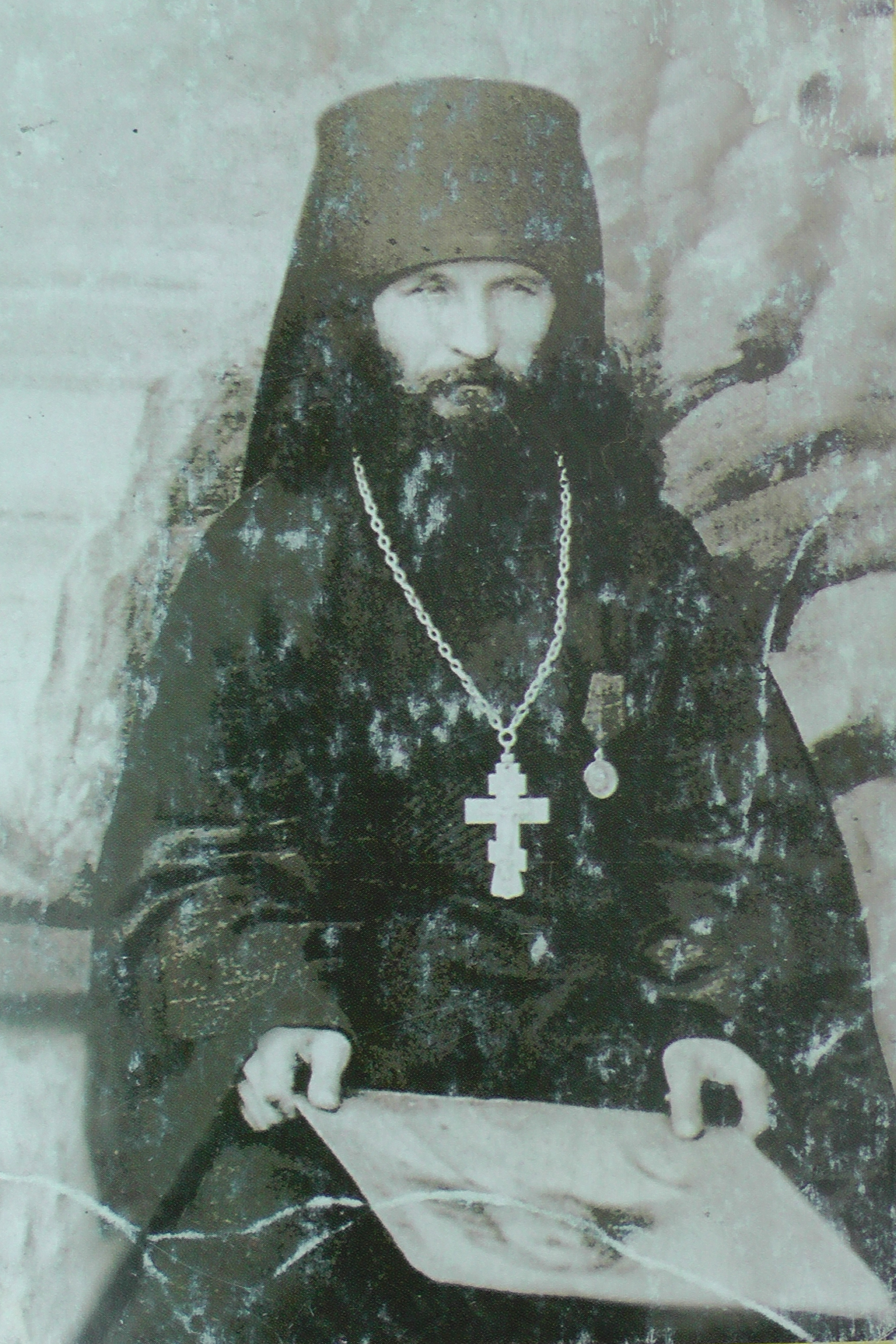
- Hieromonk Alipiy (Alexei Konstantinov)
- Born: Alexei Ivanovich Konstantinov; 21 March 1851; Lipnikovo village, Rybinsk Uyezd, Yaroslavl Governorate, Russian Empire
- Died: 30 August 1901 (aged 50)
- Occupations: Iconographer, religious painter
- Known for: Iconography, religious painting
- Style: Academicism

Alypius (secular name Alexei Ivanovich Konstantinov, (Note: In all documents the icon painter appears as Alexei Konstantinov, although the document Case of the Rybinsk Petty Bourgeois Administration on the Discharge from the Rybinsk Petty Bourgeois Society of the Rybinsk Petty Bourgeois Alexei Konstantinov Ivanov into Monasticism at Valaam Monastery reveals that Konstantin was his father's given name, not a surname.) 21 March [O.S. 9 March] 1851, Yaroslavl Governorate, Russian Empire – 30 August [O.S. 17 August] 1901, Valaam, Grand Duchy of Finland, Russian Empire) – a Russian icon painter, hieromonk of Valaam Monastery, who became known as the creator of the Valaam Icon of the Mother of God, venerated in the Russian Orthodox Church and the Finnish Orthodox Church as a miracle-working icon. Alypius was a member of the commission for the construction of the Transfiguration Cathedral of Valaam Monastery and its bell tower, led the monastery's icon-painting workshop and the icon-painting section of the art school at the monastery.

The vivid and complex personality of the artist attracted the attention of his contemporaries. He was written about by the traveller and journalist Vasily Nemirovich-Danchenko; the writer and publicist, representative of the conservative–Christian current of social thought Ivan Shmelev, and the poet, playwright and translator Konstantin Sluchevsky.

A significant number of documents relating to his life and work are preserved in the archive of New Valaam Monastery. Interest in the life and work of Alypius at the end of the 20th and beginning of the 21st century arose following the publication of the Tale of the Valaam Icon of the Mother of God found in the archive of New Valaam Monastery. (Note: The full title of the document is "Tale of the Discovery of the Image of the Most Holy Theotokos, Known as the 'Local Valaam'". The first report of the find and a retelling of its contents were published in 1997.)

Art historian Svetlana Bolshakova held that the work of Hieromonk Alypius marked a turning point in the development of the artistic style of the Valaam icon-painting workshop. She associated with his name the transition of Valaam Monastery – both in the creation of icons and in monumental murals – to the principles of the academic school of painting.

== Biography ==
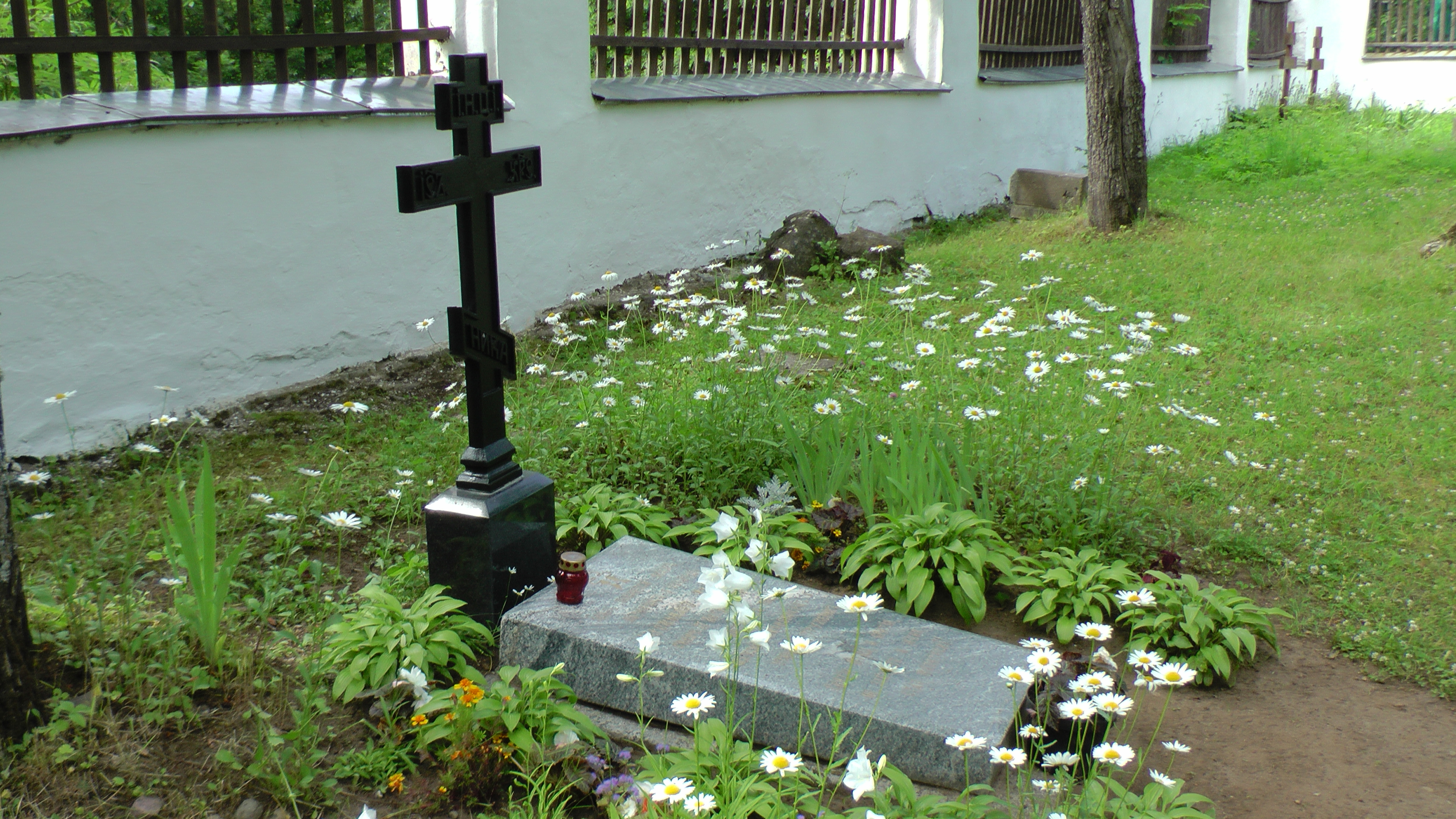
Alypius's grave at the Brotherly Cemetery of Valaam Monastery

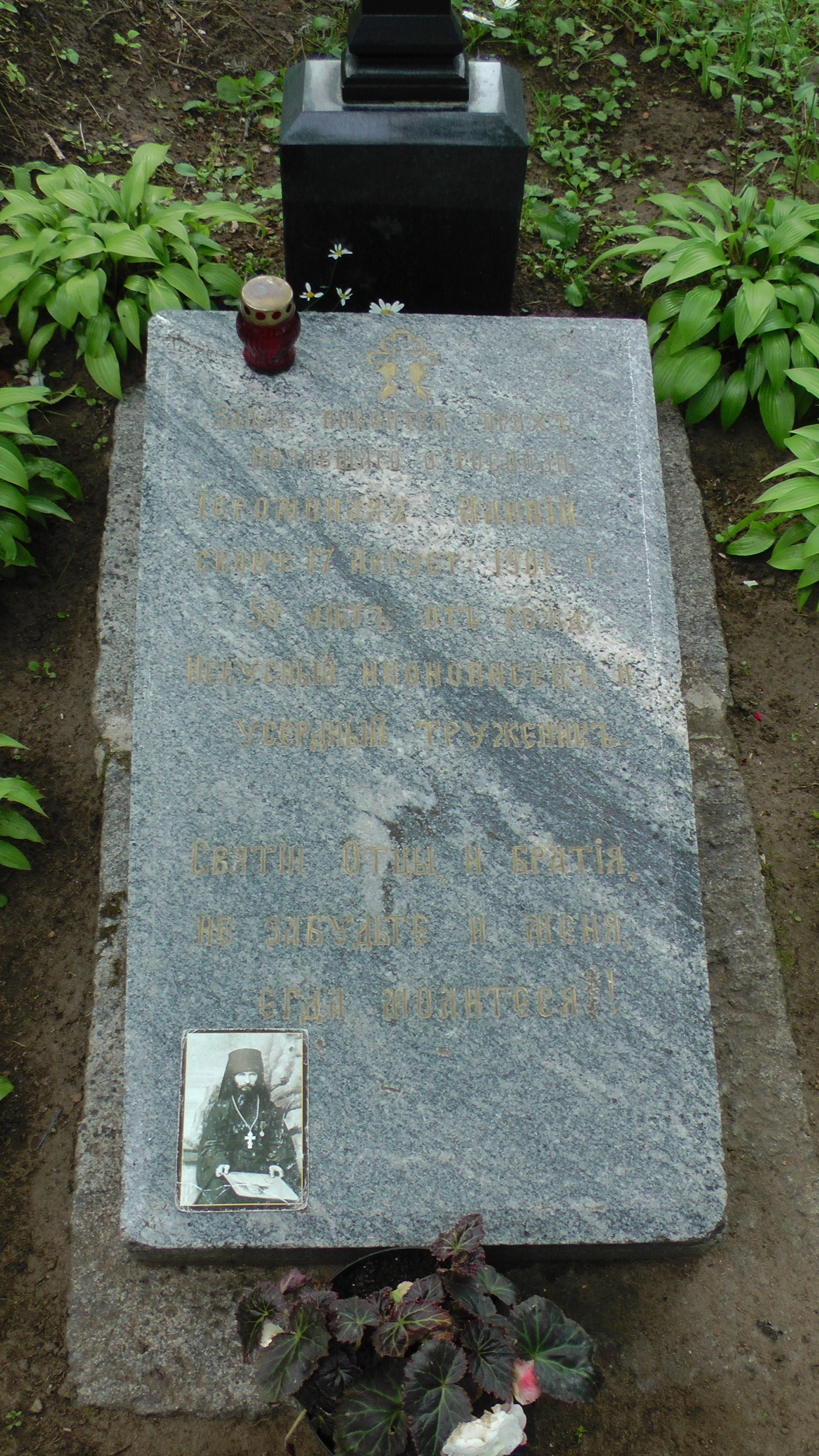
Alypius's gravestone

Alexei Konstantinov was born on 21 March [O.S. 9 March] 1851 into the family of petty bourgeois Konstantin Ivanov and Matrona Vasilyeva in the village of Lipnikovo in Rybinsk Uyezd of Yaroslavl Governorate.

Alexei Konstantinov studied at the Imperial Academy of Arts in Saint Petersburg, was awarded a small silver medal, but was unable to complete his studies due to health problems. (Note: Monastery documents mention that by the time of his arrival at the monastery Alexei Konstantinov had "studied painting to some degree in the world".)

Impressionable and inclined towards solitude, he dreamed in his youth of leaving the world and entering a monastery. On 3 September 1875, (Note: Art historian and icon painter Svetlana Bolshakova notes in her doctoral dissertation that Vasily Nemirovich-Danchenko, in the book Po Severo-Zapadu (Through the Northwest), erroneously gives the year 1873. The same date (1873) is also given by Konstantin Sluchevsky in the second volume of his book Po Severo-Zapadu Rossii (Through Northwestern Russia). Alipiy's biographer Gennady Belovolov suggests that Alexei Konstantinov arrived twice at Valaam (in 1873 and 1874) as a trudnik – that is, as a "seasonal worker" – and therefore was not mentioned in the monastery's documents.) he was admitted to Valaam Monastery as someone "residing for spiritual contemplation and joining monastic life". On 23 May 1879, he became a novice; on 12 May 1884 he took monastic vows with the name Alypius in honour of the Venerable Alypius of the Caves, the first known Russian icon painter by name; on 28 June 1892 he was ordained as a hierodeacon, and in 1893 as a hieromonk. In 1896, Hieromonk Alypius was awarded a silver medal to be worn on the chest on the Alexander ribbon; and also in 1896 he was awarded the nabedrennik.

Having become a well-known icon painter, Alypius retained his humility and modesty, and often performed "obedience at the refectory". He had a particular veneration of the Mother of God. He painted the cathedral icon of the Valaam Mother of God while the brethren read an akathist in her honour.

He died on 30 August [O.S. 17 August] 1901 on the day of commemoration of Alypius of the Kiev Caves. A brief entry in the metrical book reads: "...died from burns, buried on 18 August. The funeral was served by Abbot Gabriel (Note: Gabriel, abbot (secular name Georgy Gavrilov; 1848–1910), born into a peasant family, arrived at Valaam in 1866, tonsured as a monk in 1880. In 1891, following the death of Abbot Ionathan II (Dmitriev), he was elevated to the rank of superior of the Valaam Monastery. On 6 March 1903 Abbot Gabriel was appointed superior of the Holy Trinity Alatyr Men's Monastery of the Simbirsk Eparchy with elevation to the rank of archimandrite, and was buried there.) in concelebration". Abbot Gabriel himself makes no mention of this fact in his diary. The monastery's meteorological records for 1901 note two natural disasters that Bolshakova, in her dissertation, associates with this event:

- A month before the death of Hieromonk Alypius, Sosnovets Island burned down.
- Three days before 17 August, during the early liturgy, lightning broke through a window in the dome of the Transfiguration Cathedral and split a wooden beam on the bell tower to which a bell was attached.

However, Bolshakova was unable to find any information about casualties in these events in the official documents of the monastery.

The exact burial place in the Brotherly Cemetery of Valaam Monastery has not been established, but a granite gravestone survives, inscribed:

Here rest the remains of the Hieromonk Alypius, died 17 August 1901, aged 50. A skilled icon painter and a diligent toiler. Holy fathers and brethren, forget me not when ye pray!

== Personality ==
G. V. Gavrilenko (a staff member of the Valaam Monastery Museum) talking about the Hieromonk Alypius's personality

The writer Vasily Nemirovich-Danchenko met Alypius in the Valaam workshop during his journeys through the Russian Empire, and described him as a small, frail man whose golden hair "stood like a cap on his head and could not be combed through with any comb", with sad, kind eyes and a pale, seemingly tormented face. He also noted the authority that the quite young monk enjoyed among the monastery's brethren. One of the monks commented in his presence about the painter: "the Lord granted him a talent for the benefit of the brethren – such a talent as even worldly, loud-acclaimed artists might vainly envy!" When the writer wanted to meet Konstantinov personally and view his works, he "got embarrassed, blushed, and grew flustered". The artist confessed to the writer that after conceiving a painting, he never began its execution immediately, waiting instead for inspiration from God.

Nemirovich-Danchenko was struck by the way the monastery encouraged the icon painter's work: Konstantinov was supplied with French and English "illustrations" on subjects on which he had already finished working. In his book Muzhitskaya obitel ("A Peasant Monastery"), the publicist wrote:

One feels indignant and annoyed on his behalf. A living soul, struggling. Even worse – not struggling, but having made peace, considering this place the finest on all the earth, and his cassock and skufia the highest happiness... Clearly, talent will little by little wither. Soon these sad eyes will dim, and his lively, expressive face, on which impressions constantly shift, will take on the dry monastic crease – then too the pure lines of drawing will coarsen, the delicate colours will fade, life will die in the figures, and from an artist who promised much there will emerge a plain, run-of-the-mill icon painter...

The writer noted the "feminine softness" of Alypius's icon-painting style, calling him the Valaam Raphael. Despite his outward fragility and the distinctive character of his artistic style, Alexei Konstantinov was persistent and resolute: according to Nemirovich-Danchenko, one of the reasons for Alypius's departure to the monastery was a conflict with his parents, who did not want to see their son become an icon painter and beat him. Bolshakova noted that Alypius executed those church murals that have a complex symbolic and dogmatic content at their foundation.

Alypius was also a member of the commission for the construction of a stone cathedral church with a bell tower. Among his papers there survives a draft of an unknown akathist to the Mother of God which, in the opinion of Archpriest Gennady Belovolov – biographer of Alexei Konstantinov – was composed by Alypius painter himself.

Rejoice, O Intercessor who putteth us not to shame! Rejoice, O most gracious Mother of God! Rejoice, O Purification of the world! Rejoice, O Joy of the sorrowful and Harbour of the storm-tossed! Rejoice, O thou who helpest all who are in need! Do thou therefore preserve me also, O Virgin, O Most Pure Lady of all the sorrowful!

== Icon painting and artistic activities ==
In his adolescence, Konstantinov showed aptitude for the visual arts, which his parents did not understand. The young man's interest in painting got the monastery's leadership attention (V. R. Ryvkin claimed that Alexei Konstantinov was already an icon painter before arriving at Valaam Monastery) and he was assigned to the icon-painting workshop.

=== Studying ===
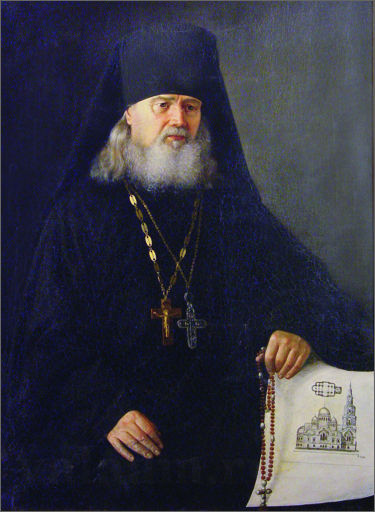
Ionathan (Dmitriev), Abbot of Valaam Monastery, until 1891

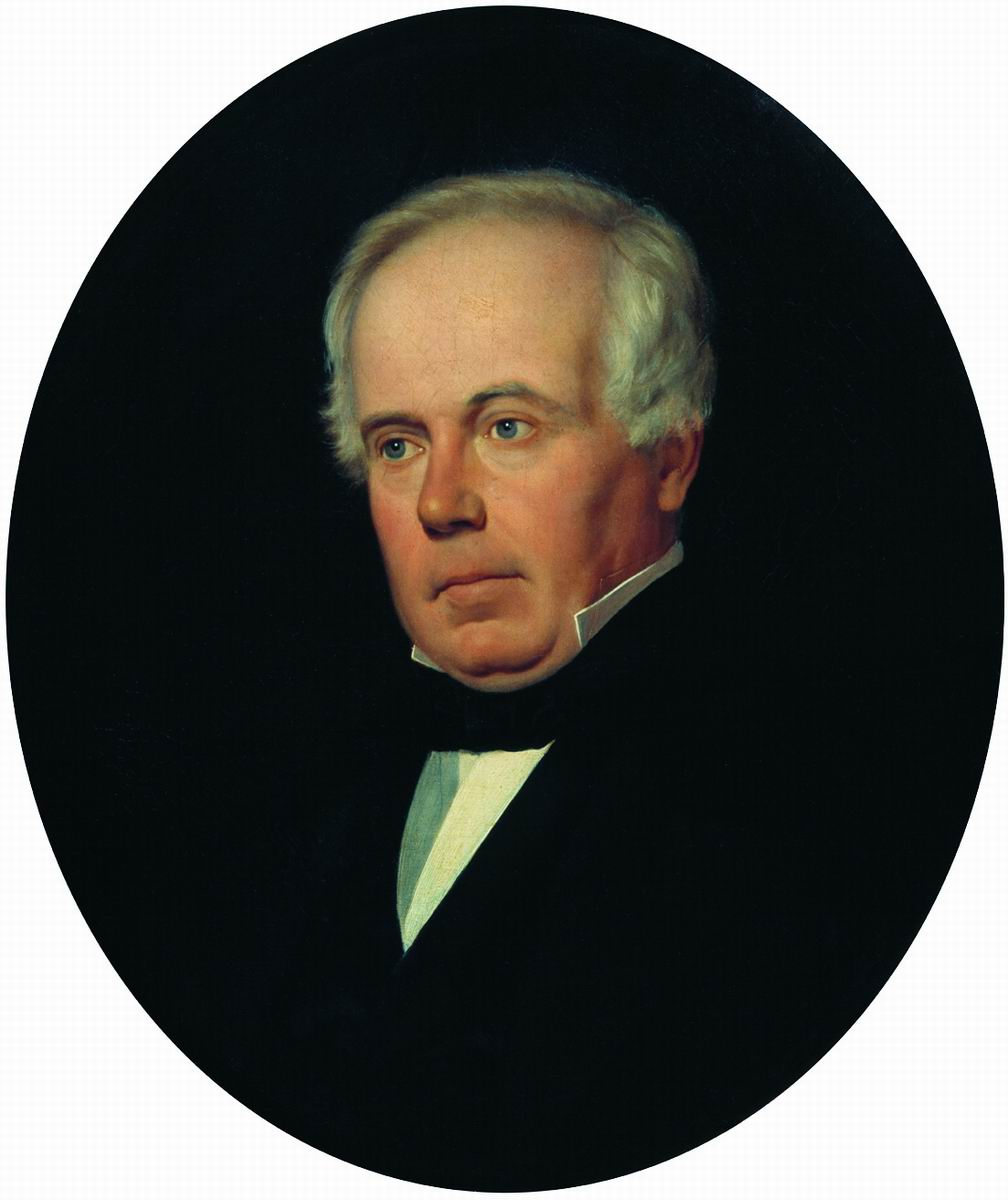
Sergei Zaryanko. Portrait of engraver and rector of the Imperial Academy of Arts Fyodor Ivanovich Iordan, 1855

The monastery treasurer Ionathan, who was acting as abbot, sent Konstantinov to study at the Imperial Academy of Arts. With the assistance of academy rector Fyodor Iordan (the writer, journalist and local historian Anatoly Bakhtiaryov saw a portrait of Fyodor Iordan with a dedicatory inscription in Alypius's workshop at Valaam) he was enrolled. His name does not appear in the documents of the Imperial Academy of Arts, and his biographer Gennady Belovolov suggests that Konstantinov was an external student. He presumably studied from 1879 to 1882; these dates are reconstructed by Bolshakova in her dissertation from the facts that in 1878 Konstantinov was still at Valaam and in that same year painted the Valaam Icon of the Mother of God there, and in 1882 he received a silver medal from the academy – though not in person, as was customary: Konstantinov was again at Valaam, and the medal was sent to him there by the academy. He received the small honorary silver medal for a work on a subject from sacred history shown at an academic exhibition in 1882. Art historian Irina Buseva-Davydova considered the award to be evidence of his considerable talent. Bakhtiaryov, in his essay Valaam Monastery, claims that this award was given to Konstantinov for a "drawing" of the Nativity of Christ, which he personally saw at Valaam. Konstantinov was unable to complete the Academy of Arts owing to his state of health. According to another version, the cause was a lack of funds.

=== Alypius as an icon painter ===
While engaged in icon painting, Alypius did not abandon secular painting and poetry. He often went into the forest to make en plein air sketches ("to paint God's nature in silence"). (Note: It is known that Konstantinov was personally acquainted with the landscape painter Ivan Shishkin.) Abbot Ionathan saw a danger to a monk in this. When he called Alypius a lazybones, the artist left the monastery for two years. Bolshakova reconstructed the dating of this event – 1889–1890 – on the basis of Abbot Ionathan's correspondence. Gennady Belovolov found documents in the archive of New Valaam Monastery that allowed the event to be dated precisely. In August 1889 Konstantinov requested leave for two months to go to Rybinsk "to visit relatives", but did not return by the appointed time. He submitted a petition to the church authorities for a transfer to one of the monasteries of Yaroslavl Governorate. The matter reached the Chief Procurator of the Holy Synod, Konstantin Pobedonostsev, who personally met the icon painter at Trinity-Sergius Hermitage near Saint Petersburg in the summer of 1890. Pobedonostsev sympathised with Konstantinov's situation and recommended that his request be granted. During this time Konstantinov suffered from insomnia and was tormented by pangs of conscience. He was compelled to return to the monastery and asked the abbot's forgiveness. The obituary of Alypius published in the journal Istorichesky Vestnik (Historical Herald) mentions that, already a monk, Alypius received his first award for a composition at one of the academic exhibitions. (The obituary does not specify the time of this award.)

Alypius created fresco murals in the churches and sketes of Valaam and painted a large number of icons. His collaborators in working on icons were Abbot Gabriel and Hieromonk Luka. (Note: Hieromonk Luka (secular name Mikhail Bogdanov, born 1841), a petty bourgeois from Staraya Russa, came to Valaam Monastery in 1889 at the age of 48 from the Novgorod Treasury, was tonsured into riassophore in 1892, into the mantiya with the name Luka in 1893, ordained as a hierodeacon in 1896 and then as a hieromonk, and in 1898 was transferred to Olonets Governorate to teach painting and drawing to seminarians at the Olonets Theological Seminary in Petrozavodsk. No verified works by Luka have been identified to date. Leonid Reznikov in his book on Valaam also names the monk icon painters Ananiya, Dosifei, and Fotiy. The high quality of the murals, in his opinion, is evidenced by the legends that spread at the beginning of the 20th century about the participation of Ilya Repin in the murals of the Transfiguration Cathedral and the passing of the secret of the paints for depicting the "sky" on its dome by Arkhip Kuindzhi.) Doctor of Philology Leonid Reznikov held that it was precisely Gabriel who was the inspiration behind the murals of the Valaam churches and chapels – "an example of fierce capacity for work" – but that owing to his lack of professional artistic education he could not play the role of supervisor of such works. In the opinion of some art historians, the work of the three icon painters gave rise to a distinctive Valaam icon-painting style (philosopher Viktor Kutkovoy does not consider it possible to distinguish such a style and insists only on differences in "creative manners" of individual workshops within the icon painting of that time). One of Alypius's first works was the decoration of the All Saints skete church. Konstantin Sluchevsky, who visited Valaam in 1887, found him at work on the frescoes of this church. He wrote:

The church is only being finished, and its interior is occupied by scaffolding; the walls and dome are being painted by a monk, a former pupil of the figure class of the Academy of Arts... he is particularly successful at the depiction of all the celestial incorporeal powers in the dome.

Alypius regarded the painting of the Transfiguration Cathedral in 1891–1896 as the main work of his life. He painted icons for the five-tiered iconostasis of the upper church of the Transfiguration Cathedral. (Bolshakova calls it four-tiered and considers Alypius the head of a group of artists who executed the icons for it.) In the cathedral, his brush produced the wall paintings The Transfiguration of the Lord (this fresco was particularly noted by a traveller who visited the church in 1908, calling it "wonderful"), The Ascension of Christ, The Meeting of the Lord, The Old Testament Trinity, The Resurrection of Christ and several others, created in the upper church of the Transfiguration Cathedral and executed in 1893–1896. The murals of the lower church of the hierarchs Sergius of Valaam and Herman of Valaam, on which Alypius worked in 1891 and 1892, have not survived. Contemporaries attributed to Alypius the icons of the Mother of God of the Three Hands and of Saint Nicholas, painted for the monastery refectory.

== Characteristics and the most famous works ==
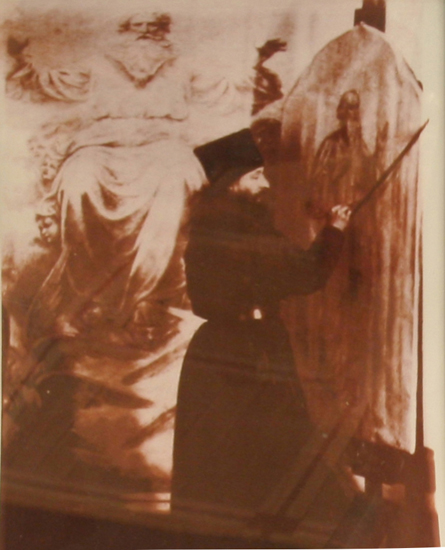
Hieromonk Alypius at work

Viktor Kutkovoy places Alypius's work within the academic style in icon painting, characterised by "lifelikeness" – he sought to express a mystical principle, but expressed his thoughts in the language of secular painting, "trying to explain heavenly mysteries through earthly realities". (Note: In the broader context, the problem of the influence of Saint Petersburg painting, and above all of academic painting, on Valaam icon painting is examined in an article by archimandrite Arseny.) He considers the merit of Hieromonk Alypius to be his turn to the iconographic experience of painters of the past, in order to "overcome the transient through tradition".

Alypius's inner world and tranquillity were reflected in his icons. His work was described at Valaam as "spiritual vision of heavenly-eternal beauty". Alypius pondered his conception at length, began work on an icon when he felt the action of divine grace, painted it with prayer, and worked over a prolonged period. He was written about by the Russian writer, traveller and journalist Vasily Nemirovich-Danchenko; the writer and publicist, representative of the conservative–Christian current of social thought Ivan Shmelev (who preserved the account of the Valaam monks about Alypius's withdrawal from secular painting); the theologist and future archbishop Hieromonk Damian; and the Russian poet, writer, playwright and translator Konstantin Sluchevsky. For some his work was the benchmark of mastery and deep comprehension of the icon's meaning – as for Hieromonk Damian – while for others it became a symbol of talent extinguished in the monastery, as for V. Nemirovich-Danchenko. Ivan Shmelev expressed the second view even more polemically in his early essay "On the Rocks of Valaam" ("Beyond the Edge of the World"): "Valaam, with the mighty hand of discipline that freezes thought, compressed the talent... crushed the soul of Brother Alexei, now Father Alypius, crushed the artist". However, in his later work Stary Valaam ("Old Valaam") he assessed the icon painter's life differently: "Alypius seeks in the faces the Lord's Light... he has taken on a lofty feat of asceticism. This is no enslavement but inspiration. He paints the imperishable, heavenly-eternal beauty".

Hieromonk Damian assessed the work and activity of the icon painter as follows:

In the fullest measure this may be said (Note: The reference is to the relationship between spirituality and professionalism in the work of an artist.) of Father Alypius, the Valaam icon painter who died in September (Note: Hieromonk Damian erred here, as Alipiy in fact died not in September but in August 1901. The same error is made by the anonymous author of the icon painter's obituary in the journal Istorichesky Vestnik.) and who managed the art workshop at Valaam Monastery for about a quarter of a century. In the new Valaam Cathedral and its sketes there are many works of the deceased that make a deep impression. The influence of the icon painter is acknowledged as enormous, since Valaam is the teacher of icon painting for all of the Russian North.

Alypius frequently used gilded backgrounds with ornamental relief in his icons (icons for the iconostasis of the Dormition Church; the "Valaam Icon of the Mother of God" and the icon of the Lord Almighty located in the iconostasis of the Smolensk Skete; icons for the iconostases of the upper and lower churches of the Transfiguration Cathedral). Bolshakova suggested that he adopted this technique from the icon painter V. M. Peshekhonov, (Note: Vasily Makarovich Peshekhonov: icon painter to the Imperial Court, he painted icons for all newborn infants of Emperors Alexander II and Alexander III. Working in the Peshekhonov workshop was considered a great honour for icon painters, signifying recognition of their mastery and talent.) who was actively working in the monastery at the time when Alexei Konstantinov first became a novice at Valaam. Peshekhonov made ornaments by the method of chasing or burnishing on gold, while Alypius applied volumetric relief onto levkas with subsequent gilding.

Bolshakova notes in her dissertation that Alypius combined the skills and techniques characteristic of a graduate of the Academy of Arts (in composition and coloristics) with a knowledge of the icon-painting tempera technique. She suggests that Alypius's works were executed in a mixed technique, at the base of which lies "the execution of a tonal drawing and a colour underpainting in tempera paints with subsequent glazing in oil." This achieves a dense, enamel-like surface "with an extraordinarily fine luminosity of the colours from the depth of the glazing layers". Alypius's icon painting has not dimmed over the past century. Particularly striking, in the Bolshakova's opinion, is the finish in the details: the carefulness and trembling quality of the golden curls of Archangel Gabriel, the flowing folds of the light fabric of the chiton and the softness of the treatment of the fingers and toes of both the Archangel and the Mother of God. Alypius's painting is distinguished by a bright, soft and delicate pastel palette, which is sometimes explained by the particular qualities of Valaam's nature, as well as by a sculptural draughtsmanship.

An obituary of Alypius notes that, being bound by the iconographic canon, (Note: Iconographic canon: The body of rules and techniques approved by the Church governing iconography and icon painting, encompassing the content and meaning of the image, symbolism and iconography, artistic techniques and the range of subjects, theological concepts and aesthetic criteria.) he "could not develop in himself a strong sense of colour; the palette of his works is timid and naive, but the more clearly stand out his merits as an artist with a rare power and correctness of strict draughtsmanship". The author calls him "a still unknown and little appreciated Fra Angelico." His works, in his view, produce "a deep, warm, heartfelt impression".

Considering the uneven execution of the fresco compositions attributed to Alypius, Bolshakova suggests that most probably he often only supervised his pupils, while himself painting only the central image of Jesus Christ. His frescoes are characterised by an approach close to icon painting:

the absence of spatial depth (conditional or symbolic golden background), measured movements and impassivity of the figures, timelessness of the action. At the same time, the treatment of the figures – their remarkable sculptural quality and the freedom with which they are drawn, the precise and soft arrangement of the folds of garments, and the academic painting technique as a whole, impasto in the light and glazing in the shadow with a local distribution of colour patches – all speak clearly to the fact that their author was also well acquainted with the academic school of painting.

Alypius's frescoes are executed in the Byzantine technique of wax-casein tempera. The binding medium of the paint layer was composed of punic wax, (Note: Punic wax (or cera punica): white, refined wax used in encaustic painting.) sturgeon glue, and beeswax. The painting was carried out on dry plaster, onto which several layers of chalk-glue and gypsum ground were first applied, with the surface being coated with glue between the ground layers. This technique provided stability of the paint in the high humidity of Valaam. The palette of the murals has not changed over time.

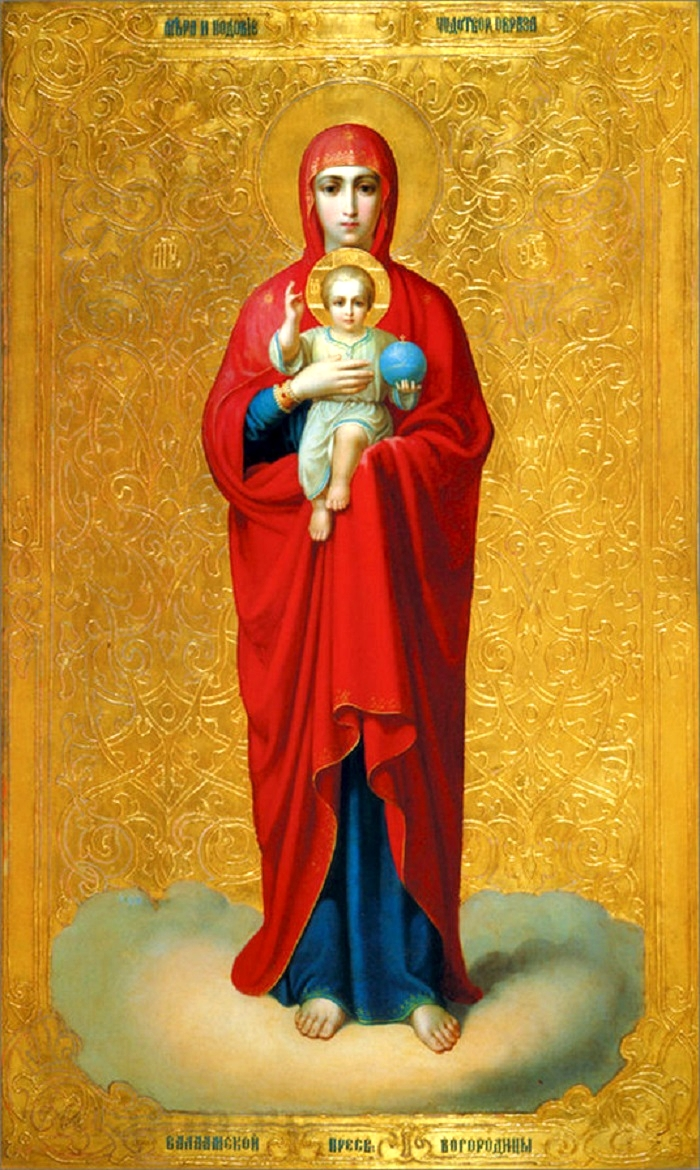
Alipy. The Valaam Icon of the Mother of God. New Valaam Monastery

=== Valaam Icon of the Mother of God ===
The most celebrated work of Alypius was the Valaam Icon of the Mother of God. The icon was painted in a technique combining tempera and oil painting. Alypius was 26 years old when he created it (in 1878). At Valaam the icon was given the name "Local Valaam". In the lower part of the icon, a particle of the robe of the Mother of God was placed by the superior of Valaam Monastery, Abbot Gabriel. The Alexei Konstantinov icon copies bear the inscription "Image and likeness of the miracle-working image of the Valaam Mother of God". The icon is frequently classified by researchers as belonging to the iconographic type of Hodegetria. They note the regal bearing of Mary holding the Child, and her solemnity, which is reminiscent of icons of the Mother of God associated with the Byzantine imperial court.

Bolshakova considered the iconography of the icon to be original, yet indirectly related to the image of Nikopoios ("the Victory-Maker"). She also noted Konstantinov's desire to approach the ideal of the time, Raphael's Sistine Madonna – in the composition "one senses the beginning or continuation of a certain narrative thread; the viewer observes as if an action unfolding in time: the movements of the figures of the Mother of God and the Child convey a momentary state that is about to change – that is, the action unfolds within a changing time and space".

Bolshakova observes that the golden background with an ornament of lilies (a symbol of purity) underscores the otherworldly nature of the space, and that the gestures of the Mother of God and the Child are inscribed within a circle (a symbol of eternity). The composition of the icon emphasises not the earthly aspect of the existence of the Mother of God and the Saviour – as is characteristic of church painting of the 19th century that drew on Western European models – but the liturgical significance of the image, which is proper to the Byzantine icon.

The iconography of this icon, in the opinion of Elizaveta Korpelainen, does not cite ancient models, but combines elements of the Byzantine iconographic type of Nikopoios (in such icons the Mother of God holds Jesus before her like a shield) with the icon-painting type of Great Panagia (in which the Mother of God is depicted full-length with Jesus on her lap).

As iconographic prototypes for the Valaam Icon of the Mother of God, Kutkovoy considers the mosaic in the apse from the Church of the Dormition in Nicaea and the mosaic Mother of God between Emperor John II Komnenos and Empress Irene (1118, south gallery of Hagia Sophia in Constantinople). In scholarly articles the suggestion has been made that Alypius may have undertaken pilgrimages during which he had the opportunity to acquaint himself with these iconographic types. (Note: Thus Viktor Kutkovoy suggested journeys to Nicaea, Chalcedon and Constantinople to visit Hagia Sophia, but allowed that Alipiy may have become acquainted with the Nicaean image and the Nikopoios from an unknown copy through a photograph or, more probably, through a lithograph.) Elizaveta Korpelainen considers this debatable, since the Valaam Icon of the Mother of God differs from canonical models in its semantic details and is related to them only in general features and associatively. She argues that its models were icon-pictures by academic painters in the churches of Saint Petersburg and its environs. In particular, she considered the Kostomarov Icon of the Mother of God (Note: It is believed that the Kostomarov Icon of the Mother of God was painted by V. V. Shokarev, a supplier of icons to the imperial court and academician of the Moscow Academy of Arts. The image so closely resembles the Valaam Icon that for a time it was considered one of its copies.) as a possible model. According to tradition, this icon was presented to the Saviour Kostomarov Skete Church by Emperor Alexander I in 1818. She also writes of the influence on the icon of the Lutheran mystical movement of Pietism, as a result of which "the image of divine love acquired... features of romantic sentimentality".

The Mother of God is depicted full-length on a cloud in a golden radiance; she supports the infant Christ with one hand concealed beneath the hem of her garment and with the other hand in front. The Mother of God appears to be shielding him from future suffering. The feet of the Mother of God are depicted without shoes (a detail that Korpelaynen notes as an original element in Orthodox iconography). Christ's right hand gives a blessing, while in his left he holds an orb surmounted by a cross.

== Head of the icon-painting workshop and school ==
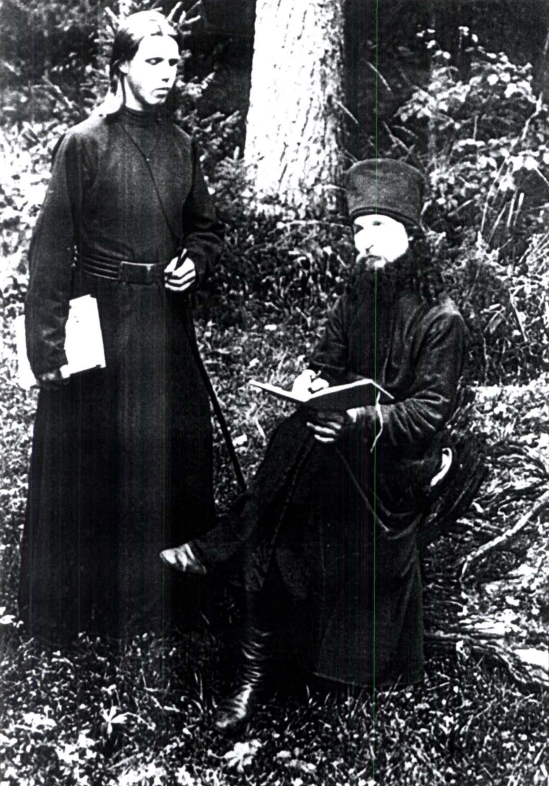
Hieromonk Alypius with a novice pupil. Archive of New Valaam Monastery

From the mid-1880s Alypius headed the monastery's icon-painting workshop, which comprised twelve monks and novices. The history of the icon-painting school of Valaam Monastery is a matter of debate among researchers. Some publications assert that it was organised only in the 1890s in connection with the need to decorate the Transfiguration Cathedral then under construction. Finnish researchers and V. R. Rybkin associated its emergence with the name of Academy of Arts student V. A. Bondarenko. (Note: Vladimir Arkhipovich Bondarenko, (1866–1900): a landscape and portrait painter who graduated from the Odessa Drawing School, studied at the Academy of Arts (from 1890) under I. I. Shishkin and then under A. I. Kuindzhi, and in 1897 received the title of class artist of the third degree.) Drawing on her analysis of the letters of Abbot Ionathan to the Ecclesiastical Consistory, Svetlana Bolshakova establishes that the Valaam art school already existed by the end of the 1880s, that it was headed at that time by Alypius himself, but that up to the 1890s only "a very narrow circle of persons" were being taught there. She suggests that the school was founded not by Alypius himself but somewhat earlier, by Academy of Arts graduates who had remained at the monastery: Alexander Mashkov (Note: Alexander Mashkov: In the 1850s a professional artist who had been studying at the Saint Petersburg Academy of Arts joined the monastery's brethren as a novice.) and Ivan Ivanov. (Note: Ivan Panfilov Ivanov, a drawing teacher from the Saint Petersburg Academy of Arts, who became a novice of Valaam Monastery.)

Bolshakova notes as remarkable that Abbot Gabriel – himself an icon painter – in his diary entries frequently mentions not Alypius but another artist who taught at the school, Hieromonk Luka. Alypius is named in the abbot's diary only once, and not in connection with icon painting, the entry simply recording the day of his ordination as hieromonk. Bolshakova explains this by Gabriel's resentment at Alypius's temporary departure from Valaam Monastery, which had occurred under Abbot Ionathan. In the book Opisanie Valaamskogo monastyrya i skitov yego (Description of Valaam Monastery and Its Sketes), published in 1904, the two icon painters are mentioned as heads of different departments of the art school in the monastery: Alypius of the icon-painting department, and Luka of the painting department. Buseva-Davydova asserts that Abbot Gabriel deemed it necessary "to transform the monastery's icon-painting workshop into an art school of the academic type". She explains this by "the work of writing icons and painting the interiors of the main cathedral, which was of exceptional importance for the monastery".

A contemporary described Alypius's role as a teacher as "enormous", noting that "hundreds of novice icon painters" had studied under him.

== Legacy ==
The majority of Valaam icons bear the standard inscription "by the labours of the monks of Valaam Monastery", which makes their attribution difficult. Only two of the surviving icons created by Hieromonk Alypius are signed – the icon of Sergius of Radonezh and the Konevskaya Icon of the Mother of God. A drawing with Alypius's signature was found in the collections of the New Valaam Monastery museum (Bolshakova also attributes to him an unsigned drawing of the Last Supper.) The remaining works presumably created by Alexei Konstantinov are identified by the characteristic features of his artistic manner.

The Valaam Icon of the Mother of God was for a time forgotten and placed in storage in the abandoned Church of Saint Nicholas, until Natalia Andreyeva, (Note: Natalia Andreyevna Andreyeva was healed through the icon of a severe form of rheumatism on 11 July 1897.) a resident of Saint Petersburg, was healed of her ailment through prayers before it. After this, veneration of the icon began. Among those who held it in great esteem were Grand Duke Nikolai Nikolaevich the Younger and his brother, Grand Duke Peter Nikolaevich. A copy of the Valaam Icon was made for Nikolai Nikolaevich in the icon-painting workshop of Valaam. After Russia entered World War I, Nikolai Nikolaevich, who had become Supreme Commander-in-Chief of all the land and naval forces of the Russian Empire, donated a thousand roubles to the monastery, "so that this capital should remain untouched and the interest from it be used for the eternal lighting of a vigil lamp before the image of the Most Holy Theotokos of Valaam".

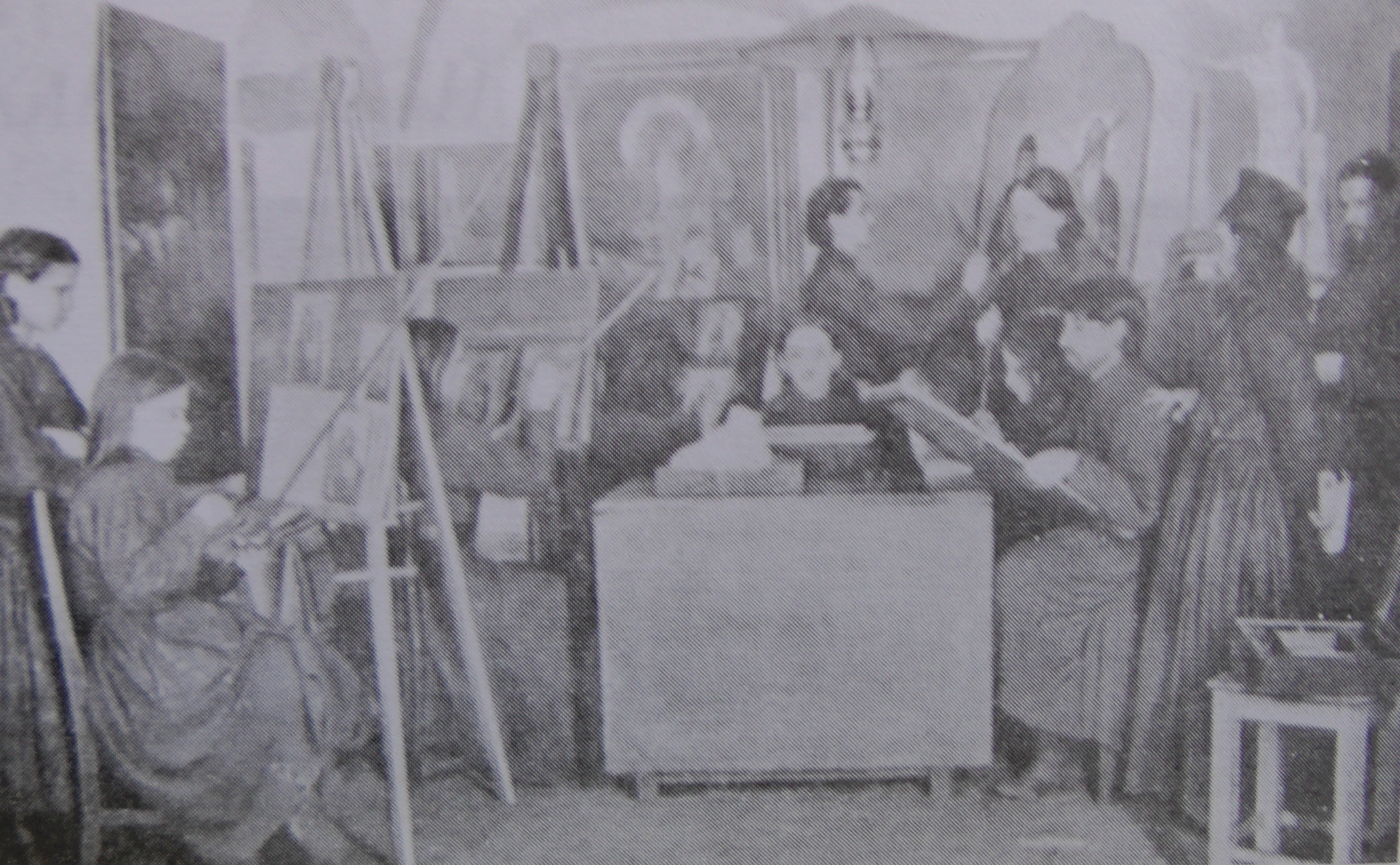
The icon-painting workshop of Valaam. Second from the right is Hieromonk Alypius

Until 1940 the icon remained at Valaam, which after 1917 had become part of Finland; in 1940 the icon was taken by the Valaam monks to a newly founded monastery, New Valaam. Since that time the Valaam Image of the Mother of God has been kept there in the Transfiguration Cathedral. In Russia, a venerated copy of the icon, created by the Valaam monks in 1900, is kept in Valaam Monastery (it was originally in the chapel of Valaam Monastery on Vasilyevsky Island in Saint Petersburg; in 1932 it was transferred to the church in honour of the Smolensk Icon of the Mother of God at Smolensk Orthodox Cemetery). Bolshakova notes its resemblance to Alypius's creative manner, but the question of its authorship, in her view, "raises questions": on the one hand, Hieromonk Alypius was still alive and could indeed have executed the copy of the famous icon himself; on the other hand, "the painting and draughtsmanship are more rigid than in the original, and the facial type is somewhat altered, though it has much in common with other works" of Alypius. Gennady Belovolov regards this copy as a work by Alypius himself and considers it one of his last works.

In the monastery there is a church dedicated to the Valaam Icon, for which an exact copy of the image was painted. Bolshakova writes that in New Valaam Monastery (in addition to the miracle-working original) two icons of the Lord Almighty are on display, one of which was created as a pair to the Valaam Icon of the Mother of God and was in the iconostasis of the Smolensk Skete, together with a further copy of the Valaam Icon of the Mother of God. She considers that the character of the icon painting makes it possible to attribute these two icons to Alypius. On 13 July 1997, in connection with the centenary of the manifestation of the Valaam Icon of the Mother of God, a feast day for the icon was established by decree of Patriarch Alexy II.

Viktor Ryvkin believes that Alypius's murals in the dome of the upper church of the All Saints Skete (1887) are lost, but the chief curator of the Valaam Museum, L. N. Pecherina, asserts that they have survived. Only individual compositions by the artist have survived on the walls of the Transfiguration Cathedral (though their state of preservation leaves much to be desired, and the greater part of the murals has been lost), as well as some icons for the iconostases of Valaam (executed in the mid-1890s). The icons Deisis and The Lord Sabaoth from the Transfiguration Cathedral were sent to the museum's collections for restoration; V. P. Makarov restored the paint layer. In 1994 they were returned to the monastery; the Deisis was placed in a kiot above the reliquary shrine of the venerable Sergius of Valaam and Herman of Valaam. The icon The Lord Sabaoth was returned to the iconostasis. It is currently in the altar of the St Nicholas Skete church.

On the basis of mentions by Vasily Nemirovich-Danchenko of the titles of compositions he saw in the Alypius's workshop, Bolshakova attributes to Alypius two canvases (The Healing of the Leper and The Publican Zacchaeus in the Tree, Inviting Christ,) dated 1881 but bearing no artist's name, which are kept in New Valaam Monastery in Finland. The painting of both, in her opinion, bears the stamp of Alypius's work: a contrasting foreground set against a soft pastel background.

=== Identified works of Hieromonk Alipy ===
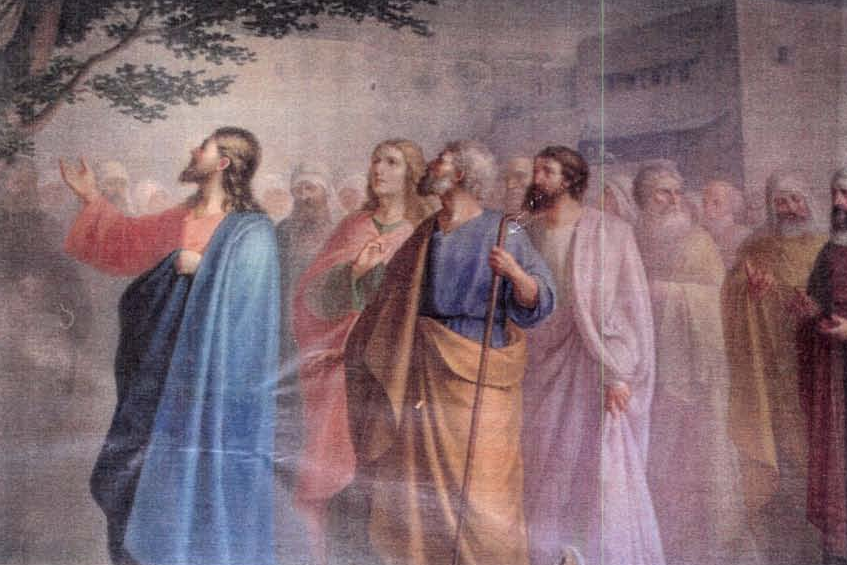
The Publican Zacchaeus in a Tree, Inviting Christ (fragment). 1881. New Valaam Monastery

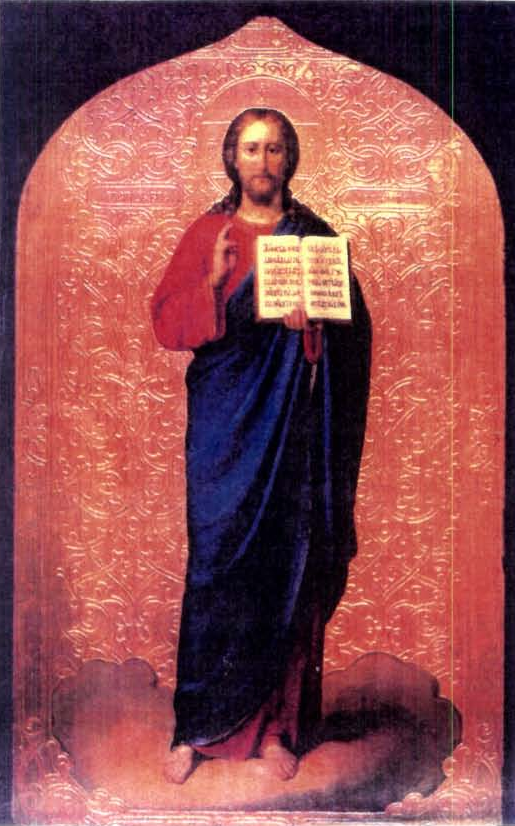
The Lord Almighty. New Valaam Monastery

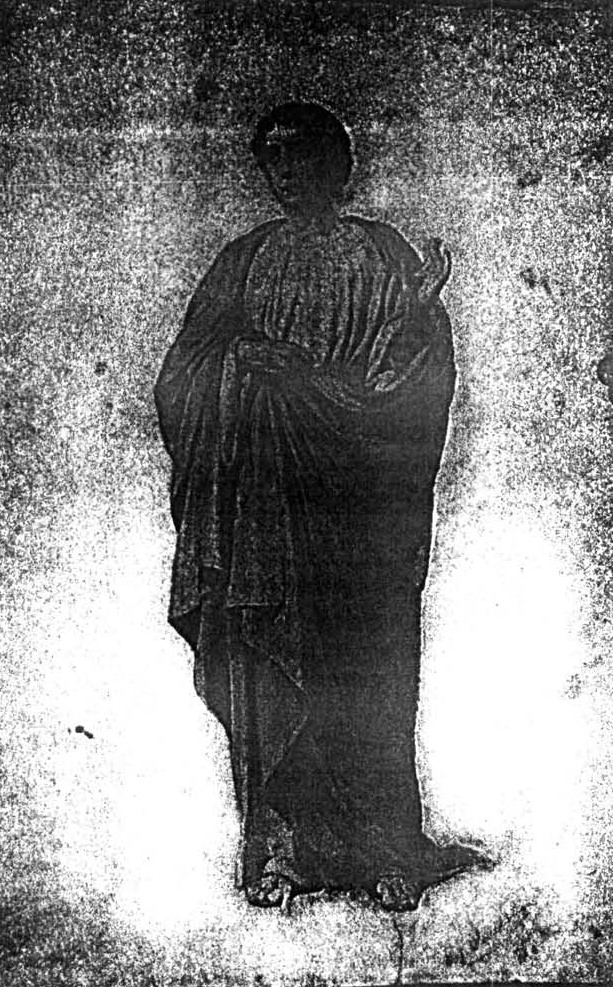
Life study, work with a model. 1895. New Valaam Monastery

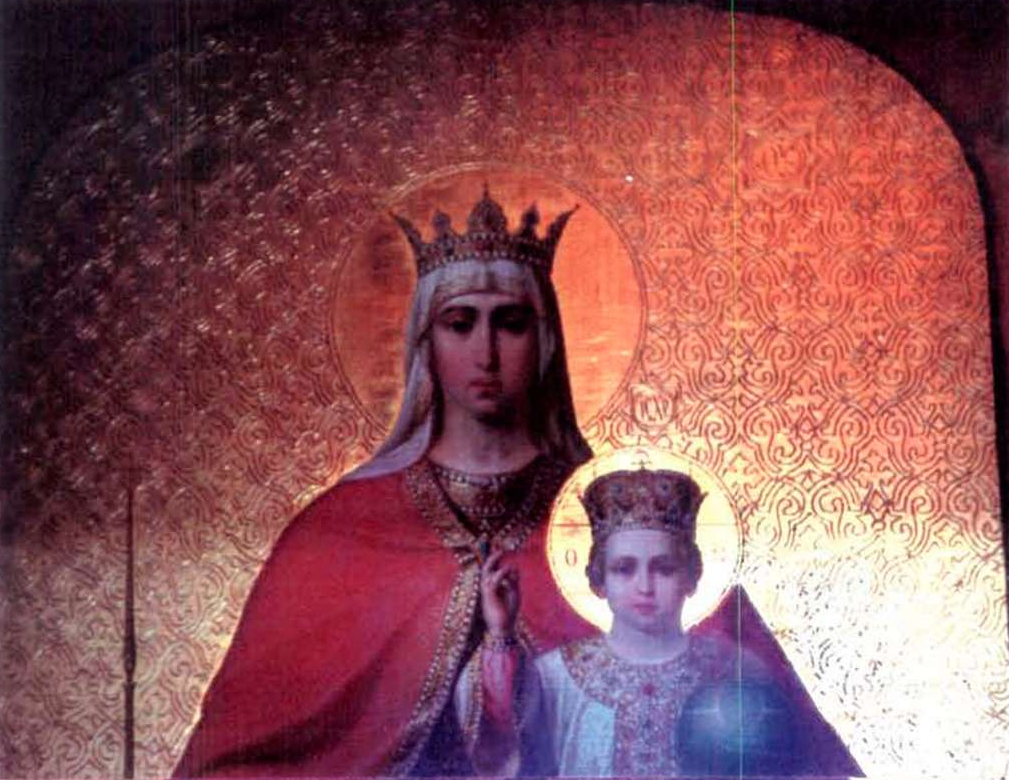
The Mother of God with the Infant on the Throne (fragment), 1896. New Valaam Monastery

== Bibliography ==
- "Alipiy [Алипий]". Istoricheskiy vestnik [Исторический вестник / Historical Herald] (Journal). 86 (12): 1302. 1901.
- Andreeva, Natalia Andreevna (2011). "Skazaniye ob obretenii obraza Presvyatoy Bogoroditsy, imenuyemogo «Mestnaya Valaamskaya» [Сказание об обретении образа Пресвятой Богородицы, именуемого «Местная Валаамская» / The Tale of the Finding of the Image of the Most Holy Theotokos, Known as the «Local Valaam»]". Valaamskiy monastyr i yego podvizhniki. 5-ye izdaniye, avtor-sostavitel A. Bertash [Валаамский монастырь и его подвижники. 5-е издание / Valaam Monastery and Its Ascetics. 5th edition, compiled by A. Bertash]. Valaam: Spaso-Preobrazhensky Valaamsky Monastery. pp. 524–530. ISBN 978-5-94263-020-1.
- Bakhtiaryov, Anatoly Aleksandrovich (1894). Po rodnym krayam. Tom I. Valaamskaya obitel. (Poyezdka na Valaam) [По родным краям. Том I. Валаамская обитель. (Поездка на Валаам) / Through Native Lands. Vol. I. The Valaam Monastery. (A Trip to Valaam)]. Saint Petersburg: (Unknown).
- Belovolov, Gennady Vladimirovich (2003). "Ieromonakh Alipiy: valaamsky ikonopisets [Иеромонах Алипий: валаамский иконописец / Hieromonk Alipiy: Valaam Icon Painter]". Russky palomnik [Русский паломник / Russian Pilgrim] (Journal) (28): 94–103.
- Belovolov, Gennady Vladimirovich (1997). Skazaniye o Valaamskoy ikone Bozhiey Materi: prazdnovaniye – Pervoye Voskreseniye posle prazdnika svyatykh Apostolov Petra i Pavla [Сказание о Валаамской иконе Божией Матери: празднование – Первое Воскресение после праздника святых Апостолов Петра и Павла / The Tale of the Valaam Icon of the Mother of God: Feast Day – First Sunday after the Feast of the Holy Apostles Peter and Paul]. Saint Petersburg: Valaam Monastery. Leushino Metochion.
- Bolshakova, Svetlana Yevgenyevna (2002). Ikony i nastennye rospisi Valaamskogo monastyrya XVIII – nachala XX vekov. Diss. … kand. iskusstvovedeniya [Иконы и настенные росписи Валаамского монастыря XVIII – начала XX веков / Icons and Wall Paintings of the Valaam Monastery of the 18th – Early 20th Centuries. Dissertation… Candidate of Art History]. Saint Petersburg: Saint Petersburg State Institute of Painting, Sculpture and Architecture named after I. E. Repin.
- Buseva-Davydova, I. L. (2014). "Ikonopis i monumentalnaya tserkovnaya zhivopis [Иконопись и монументальная церковная живопись / Icon Painting and Monumental Church Painting]" (PDF). Istoriya russkogo iskusstva v 22 t. [История русского искусства в 22 т. / History of Russian Art in 22 volumes]. Vol. 17. Iskusstvo 1880–1890-kh godov [Том 17. Искусство 1880–1890-х годов / Vol. 17. Art of the 1880s–1890s]. Moscow: State Institute of Art Studies. pp. 297–317. ISBN 978-5-98287-085-8.
- Bertash, A. (2011). Valaamskiy monastyr i yego podvizhniki. 5-ye izdaniye, avtor-sostavitel A. Bertash [Валаамский монастырь и его подвижники. 5-е издание / Valaam Monastery and Its Ascetics. 5th edition, compiled by A. Bertash]. Valaam: Spaso-Preobrazhensky Valaamsky Monastery. ISBN 978-5-94263-020-1.
- Damian (1998). "Problemy i nedostatki masterov zhivopistsev [Проблемы и недостатки мастеров живописцев / Problems and Shortcomings of Painter-Masters]". O tserkovnoy zhivopisi: Sbornik [О церковной живописи: Сборник / On Church Painting: A Collection]. Saint Petersburg: Society of Saint Basil the Great. ISBN 5-7984-0015-8.
- Kiselkova, V. F.; Gorbacheva, V. G. (2014). "Ieromonakh Alipiy [Иеромонах Алипий / Hieromonk Alipiy]". Valaamskiye pravedniki. Staroye bratskoe kladbishche na ostrove Valaam [Валаамские праведники. Старое братское кладбище на острове Валаам / The Righteous of Valaam. The Old Brotherhood Cemetery on the Island of Valaam]. Saint Petersburg: Nestor–Istoriya. pp. 100–103. ISBN 978-5-4469-0352-8.
- Korpelaynen, E. A. (2013). "Valaamskaya ikona Bozhiey Materi i «lyuteranskaya ikona» kak fenomeny dialoga kultur [Валаамская икона Божией Матери и «лютеранская икона» как феномены диалога культур / The Valaam Icon of the Mother of God and the «Lutheran Icon» as Phenomena of Cultural Dialogue]" (PDF). Ikona i slovesnost – russkoye zarubezhe [Икона и словесность – русское зарубежье / Icon and Literature – the Russian Diaspora]: 81–90.
- Korpelaynen, E. A. (2014). "Lyuterane-ikonopistsy v Sankt-Peterburge XIX v. [Лютеране-иконописцы в Санкт-Петербурге XIX в. / Lutheran Icon Painters in 19th-Century Saint Petersburg]". Vestnik PSTGU. Seriya V. Voprosy istorii i teorii khristianskogo iskusstva [Вестник ПСТГУ. Серия V. Вопросы истории и теории христианского искусства / Bulletin of St. Tikhon's Orthodox University. Series V. Questions of the History and Theory of Christian Art] (4 (16)): 162–170.
- Opisaniye Valaamskogo monastyrya i skitov yego. S prilozheniyem izobrazheniya Sergiya i Germana Valaamskikh chudotvورtsev i 11 risunkov. Izhdiveniem Valaamskogo monastyrya. 5-ye izd., ispr. i dop. [Описание Валаамского монастыря и скитов его / Description of the Valaam Monastery and Its Hermitages. With an Appendix of the Images of Sergius and Herman of Valaam, Wonderworkers, and 11 Illustrations. At the Expense of the Valaam Monastery. 5th ed., revised and enlarged]. Saint Petersburg: Typography of I. Generalov. 1904.
- Nemirovich-Danchenko, Vasily Ivanovich (1993). "XXVI. Valaamskaya akademiya khudozhestv. Valaamskiye Rafaeli. Riznitsa i biblioteka [XXVI. Valaam Academy of Arts. The Valaam Raphaels. The Sacristy and Library]". Muzhitskaya obitel [Мужицкая обитель / The Peasant Monastery]. Staraya knizhnaya polka. Biblioteka yunogo chitatelya [Старая книжная полка. Библиотека юного читателя / Old Bookshelf. Young Reader's Library]. Moscow: Progress, Kultura. pp. 149–153. ISBN 5-01-004041-7.
- Nemirovich-Danchenko, Vasily Ivanovich (1904). "XXVII. Valaamskiye Rafaeli. Riznitsa i biblioteka [XXVII. The Valaam Raphaels. The Sacristy and Library]". Krestyanskoe tsarstvo: vospominaniya i rasskazy iz poyezdki s bogomoltsami [Крестьянское царство: воспоминания и рассказы из поездки с богомольцами / The Peasants' Kingdom: Memoirs and Stories from a Journey with Pilgrims]. Moscow: P. P. Soykin Publishing House.
- Pecherina, Larisa Nikolayevna (2008). "«Iskusny ikonopisets i userdny truzhenık» Ieromonakh Alipiy (Aleksey Konstantinov) [«Искусный иконописец и усердный труженик» Иеромонах Алипий (Алексей Константинов) / «A Skilled Icon Painter and Diligent Toiler»: Hieromonk Alipiy (Aleksei Konstantinov)]". Svet Valaama [Свет Валаама / The Light of Valaam] (Journal) (12 (24)): 162–170.
- Reznikov, Leonid Yakovlevich (1986). Valaam: krizis asketizma [Валаам: кризис аскетизма / Valaam: The Crisis of Asceticism]. Leningrad: Lenizdat.
- Ryvkin, Viktor Rafailovich (1981). Valaam. Arkhitekturno-prirodnye ansambli Valaamskogo arkhipelaga [Валаам. Архитектурно-природные ансамбли Валаамского архипелага / Valaam. Architectural and Natural Ensembles of the Valaam Archipelago]. Petrozavodsk: Kareliya.
- Ryvkin, Viktor Rafailovich (1990). Po Valaamu [По Валааму / Around Valaam]. Petrozavodsk: Kareliya. ISBN 5-7545-0227-3.
- Sluchevsky, Konstantin Konstantinovich (1897). "Valaam [Валаам]". Po Severo-Zapadu Rossii. Tom II. Po Zapadu [По Северо-Западу России. Том II. По Западу / Through Northwestern Russia. Vol. II. Through the West]. Saint Petersburg: A. F. Marks Publishing House. pp. 332–349.
- Shmelyov, Ivan Sergeyevich (1897). Na skalakh Valaama [Za granyyu mira] (Putevye ocherki) [На скалах Валаама [За гранью мира] (Путевые очерки) / On the Rocks of Valaam [Beyond the Edge of the World] (Travel Sketches)]. Moscow: Typography of E. K. Gerbek.
- Shmelyov, Ivan Sergeyevich (2013). "Stary Valaam [Старый Валаам / Old Valaam]". Pravoslavnaya Rossiya: Bogomolye. Stary Valaam [Православная Россия: Богомолье. Старый Валаам / Orthodox Russia: The Pilgrimage. Old Valaam]. Klassika v illyustratsiyakh [Классика в иллюстрациях / Classics in Illustrations]. Saint Petersburg: OLMA Media Group. pp. 191–300. ISBN 978-5-373-05062-3.
- Arseni (2003). "Ikonimaalaustyöt Valamossa ja Pietarilaiset vaikutteet [Icon Painting Works at Valaam and the St. Petersburg Influences]". diARTgnosis: study of European religious painting. Valamo. Valamon konservointilaitos (Journal): 30–39.
- Tiaynen-Qadir, Tatiana (2016). "Orthodox Icons of Mary Generating Transnational Space between Finland and Russia" (PDF). Lähde Historiallinen Aikakauskirja [Historical Scientific Journal] (Journal): 138–171.
- Tradigo, Alfredo (2006). Icons and Saints of the Eastern Orthodox Church. A Guide to Imagery. Translated by Stephen Sartarelli. Los Angeles: The J. Paul Getty Museum. ISBN 978-0-89236-845-7.
