= Alypius of Constantinople =

5th-century Byzantine priest

Alypius (Ancient Greek: Ἀλύπιος) was a priest of the great church at Constantinople, who flourished around the year 430 AD. There is extant an epistle from him to Cyril of Alexandria (in Greek), exhorting him to a vigorous resistance against the heresy of Nestorius.
