= Martyrs of Catania =

The Martyrs of Catania (Stephen, Pontian, Attalus, Fabian, Cornelius, Sextus, Flos, Quintian, Minervinus and Simplician) (Feast Day: December 31), were martyrs in Catania, Sicily.
