= Valerius Pinianus =

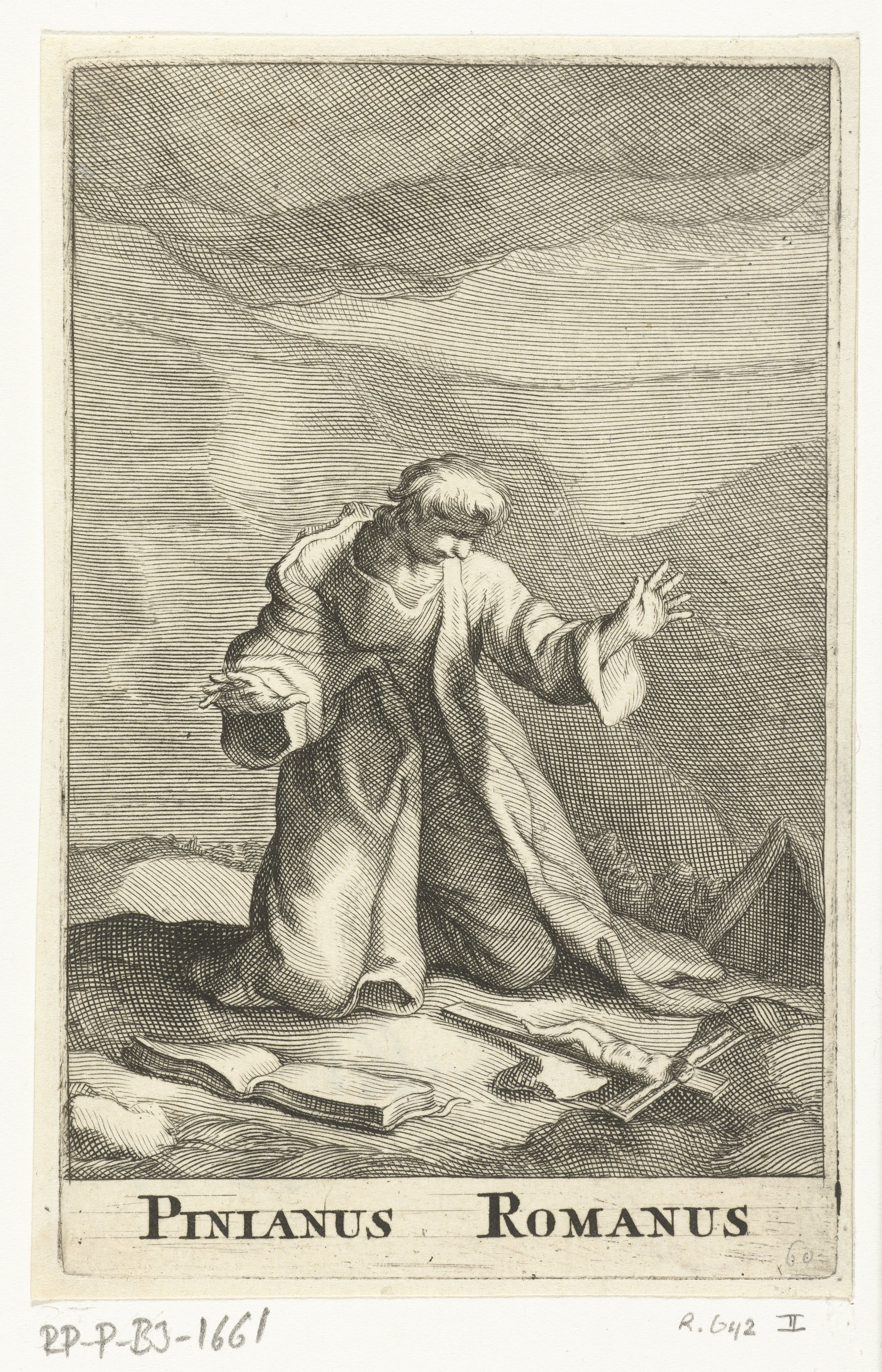

Valerius Pinianus (Pinian; ~ 381 – 420 or 432) in Jerusalem, was a member of a branch of the gens Valeria (gens Valeria Severa) and among the richest men of his time. He was the son of a Roman praefectus urbi and also had a brother named Severus. His life is closely coupled with that of his paternal cousin and wife, Melania the Younger, whom he married sometime between 396 and 400 (year mostly given as 399). After their arrival in Tagaste, North Africa in 410 and Melanias mother (possibly together with Pelagius – the year of their first encounter is sometimes given as 418), Augustine, bishop of Hippo, convinced the couple to dedicate a large part of their wealth to his church. In 417, the couple moved to Palestine.

== See also ==
- Alypius of Thagaste
