= Rule of Saint Augustine =

Document that outlines religious life of oldest monastic rule in the Western Church

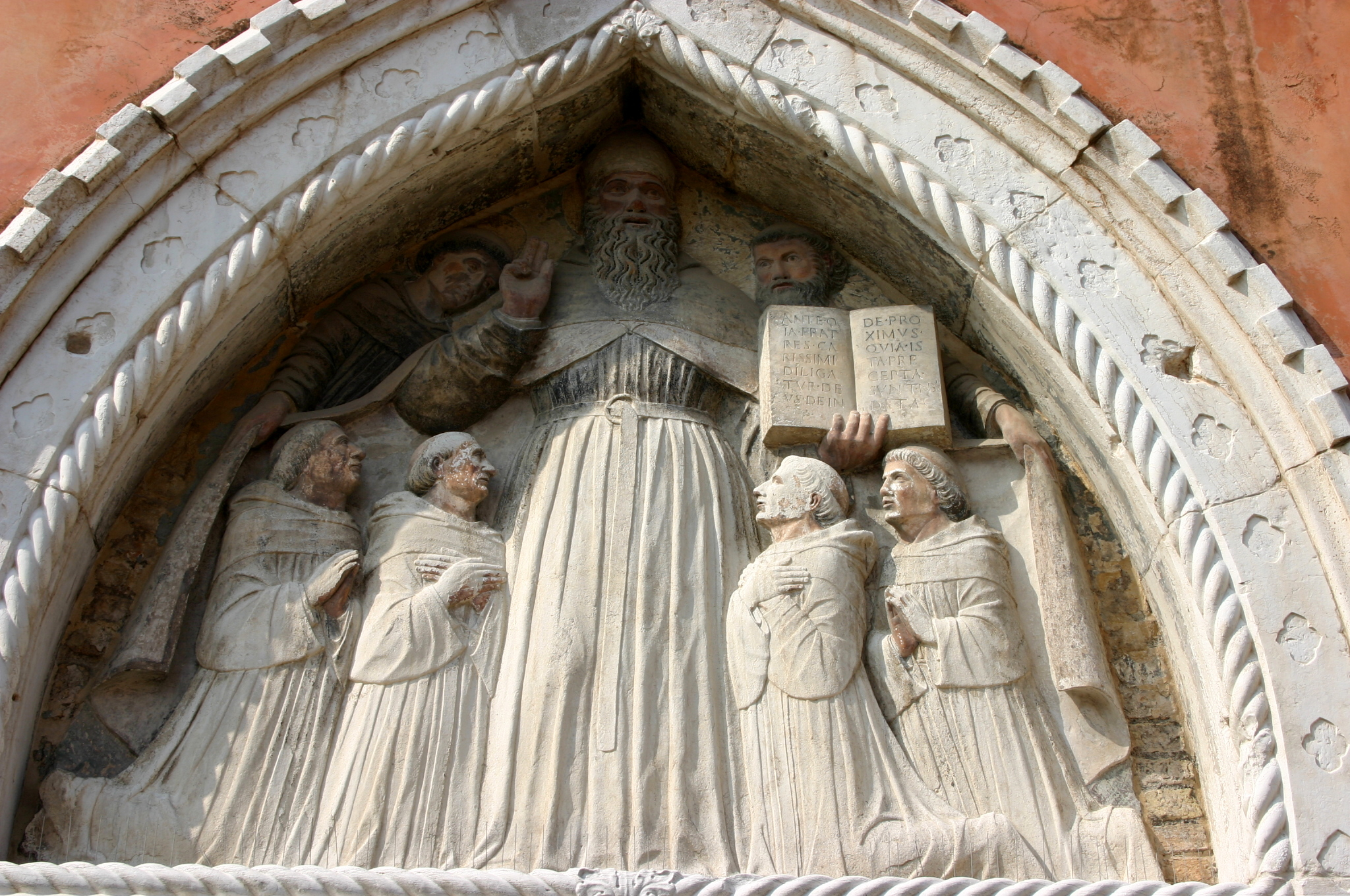
Saint Augustine surrounded by Augustinian friars (Paduan school, 15th century), relief in the portal tympanum of the former Augustinian convent of Santo Stefano in Venice. The book inscription is the beginning of the Rule of Saint Augustine: ANTE O[MN]IA FRATRES CARISSIMI DILIGATVR DEVS DEINDE PROXIMVS QVIA ISTA PR[A]ECEPTA SVNT N[O]B[IS] DATA – "First of all, most beloved brothers, God shall be loved, thereafter the neighbour, for these instructions have been given to us."

The Rule of Saint Augustine, written in about the year 400, is a brief document divided into eight chapters and serves as an outline for religious life lived in community. It is the oldest monastic rule in the Western Church.

The rule, developed by Augustine of Hippo (354–430), governs chastity, poverty, obedience, detachment from the world, the apportionment of labour, the inferiors, fraternal charity, prayer in common, fasting and abstinence proportionate to the strength of the individual, care of the sick, silence and reading during meals. It came into use on a wide scale from the twelfth century onwards and continues to be employed today by many orders, including the Dominicans, Servites, Mercedarians, Norbertines, and Augustinians.

== Monastic life of Saint Augustine ==
In 388, Augustine returned from Milan to his home in Thagaste. He then sold his patrimony and gave the money to the poor. The only thing he kept was the estate, which he converted into a monastic foundation for himself and a group of friends with whom he shared a life of prayer. Later as bishop he invited his priests to share a community life with him.

Augustine followed the monastic or religious life as it was known to his contemporaries, drafting rules for the monks and nuns of Roman Africa. Like St. Basil, Augustine's view diverged from that of the earlier eremitical approach of strict physical austerities. In The Ways of the Catholic Church, Augustine observed contemporary criticisms of the methods of the Eastern hermits in the Egyptian desert. It was said that their extreme isolation and excessive asceticism "were no longer productive" for the church or society. In response to this, "Augustine promoted poverty of spirit and continence of the heart while living in the milieu of a town such as Hippo."

In Hippo, the members of his monastic house lived in community while yet keeping to their pastoral obligations. For Augustine, 'the love of neighbour was simply another expression of the love of God." He saw the call to service in the church a necessitas (necessity) to be heeded, even if it compromised a personal desire for contemplation and study. One of the elements of communal living was simplicity of lifestyle. Regarding the use of property or possessions, Augustine did not make a virtue of poverty, but of sharing. Augustine wrote frequently on prayer, but prescribed no specific method, system, or posture; although he highly endorsed the psalms.

Several of his friends and disciples elevated to the episcopacy imitated his example, among them Alypius at Tagaste, Possidius at Calama, Profuturus and Fortunatus at Constantine, Evodius at Uzalis, and Boniface at Carthage.

== Origins of the rule ==
The title, Rule of Saint Augustine, has been applied to each of the following documents:

- Letter 211 addressed to a community of women;
- Sermons 355 and 356 entitled "De vitâ et moribus clericorum suorum";
- a portion of the rule drawn up for clerks or Consortia monachorum;
- a rule known as Regula secunda; and
- another rule called: "De vitâ eremiticâ ad sororem liber".

The last is a treatise on eremitical life by Saint Ælred, Abbot of Rievaulx, England, who died in 1166. The two preceding rules are of unknown authorship. Letter 211 and Sermons 355 and 356 were written by Augustine.

=== Letter 211 ===
Saint Augustine wrote this letter in 423 to the nuns in a monastery at Hippo that had been governed by his sister and in which his cousin and niece lived. Though he wrote chiefly to quiet troubles incident to the nomination of a new superior, Augustine took the opportunity to discuss some of the virtues and practices essential to religious life as he understood it: he emphasised such considerations as charity, poverty, obedience, detachment from the world, the apportionment of labour, the mutual duties of superiors and inferiors, fraternal charity, prayer in common, fasting and abstinence proportionate to the strength of the individual, care of the sick, silence, and reading during meals. This letter contains no such clear, minute prescriptions as are found in other monastic rules, such as that of Saint Pachomius or the anonymous document known as "the Rule of the Master". Nevertheless, the Bishop of Hippo is considered to have been a "law-giver" and his letter was to be read weekly, that the nuns might guard against or repent of any infringement of it. He considered poverty the foundation of the monastic life but attached no less importance to fraternal charity, which consists in living in peace and concord. The superior, in particular, was recommended to practice this virtue (though not, of course, to the extreme of omitting to chastise the guilty). Augustine leaves her free to determine the nature and duration of the punishment imposed, in some cases it being her privilege even to expel nuns that have become incorrigible.

In Augustine's conception, the superior shares the duties of her office with certain members of her community, one of whom has charge of the sick, another of the cellar, another of the wardrobe, while still another is the guardian of the books which she is authorised to distribute among the sisters. The nuns make their own habits, which consist of a dress, a cincture, and a veil. Prayer, in common, occupies an important place in their life, being said in the chapel at stated hours and according to the prescribed forms, and comprising hymns, psalms, and readings. Certain prayers are simply recited while others, especially indicated, are chanted, but Augustine enters into no minute details, and leaves it to the custom of the local diocese, although it is clear from his other writings that the community celebrates daily Eucharist with the local Church. Those sisters desiring to lead a more contemplative life are allowed to follow special devotions in private.

Fasting and abstinence are recommended only in proportion to the physical strength of the individual, and when the saint speaks of obligatory fasting he specifies that such as are unable to wait for the evening or ninth hour meal may eat at noon. The nuns partook of very frugal fare and, in all probability, abstained from meat. The sick and infirm are objects of the most tender care and solicitude, and certain concessions are made in favour of those who, before entering religion, led a life of luxury. During meals some instructive matter is to be read aloud to the nuns. Although the Rule of Saint Augustine contains but a few precepts, it dwells at great length upon religious virtues and the ascetic life, this being characteristic of all primitive rules.

=== De vitā et moribus clericorum suorum (On the Life and Practices of His Clergy) ===
In his sermons 355 and 356 the saint discourses on the monastic observance of the vow of poverty. Augustine sought to dispel suspicions harboured by the faithful of Hippo against the clergy leading a monastic life with him in his episcopal residence. Goods were held in common in conformity with the practice of the early Christians. This was called "the Apostolic Rule". At the same time, individuals do not receive precisely the same treatment in Augustine's Rule, since the needs of each person are different.

=== De opere monachorum ===
Bishop Aurelius of Carthage was greatly disturbed by the conduct of monks who indulged in idleness under pretext of contemplation, and at his request St. Augustine published a treatise entitled De opere monachorum wherein he proves by the authority of the Bible, the example of the Apostles, and even the exigencies of life, that the monk is obliged to devote himself to serious labour. In several of his letters and sermons is found a useful complement to his teaching on the monastic life and duties it imposes. In his treatise, De opere monachorum, he inculcates the necessity of labour, without, however, subjecting it to any rule, the gaining of one's livelihood rendering it indispensable. Monks of course, devoted to the ecclesiastical ministry observe, ipso facto, the precept of labour, from which observance the infirm are legitimately dispensed.

These, then, are the most important monastic prescriptions found in the rule of and writings of Saint Augustine.

=== De vitā eremiticā ad sororem liber ===
"De vitâ eremiticâ ad sororem liber" is a treatise on eremitical life by St. Ælred, Abbot of Rievaulx, England, an influential Cistercian abbot who died in 1166.

== Early medieval influence ==
Between 430 and 570 Augustine's rule was carried to Europe by monks and clergy fleeing the persecution of the Vandals, and was used by small groups of hermit monks and nuns, as well as by diocesan priests living in cathedral communities with their bishop.

Augustine's writings influenced the development of Western monasticism. His Letter 211 was read and re-read by Saint Benedict, who borrowed several important texts from it for insertion in his own rule. Saint Benedict's chapter on the labour of monks is inspired by the treatise De opere monachorum. The teaching concerning religious poverty is formulated in the sermons "De vitâ et moribus clericorum suorum".

The influence of Augustine, however, was nowhere stronger than in southern Gaul in the fifth and sixth centuries. Lérins and the monks of that school were familiar with Augustine's monastic writings, which, together with those of Cassianus, were the mine from which the principal elements of their rules were drawn. Saint Caesarius, Archbishop of Arles, the great organiser of religious life in that section chose some of the most interesting articles of his rule for monks from St. Augustine, and in his rule for nuns quoted at length from Letter 211. Saints Augustine and Caesarius were animated by the same spirit which passed from the Archbishop of Arles to Saint Aurelian, one of his successors, and, like him, a monastic Iawgiver. Augustine's influence also extended to women's monasteries in Gaul, where the Rule of Caesarius was adopted either wholly or in part, as, for example, at Sainte-Croix of Poitiers, Juxamontier of Besançon, and Chamalières near Clermont.

But it was not always enough merely to adopt the teachings of Augustine and to quote him; the author of the regula Tarnatensis (an unknown monastery in the Rhone valley) introduced into his work the entire text of the letter addressed to the nuns, having previously adapted it to a community of men by making slight modifications. This adaptation was surely made in other monasteries in the sixth or seventh centuries, and in his "Codex regularum" Saint Benedict of Aniane published a text similarly modified.

For want of exact information we cannot say in which monasteries this was done, and whether they were numerous. Letter 211, which has thus become the Rule of Saint Augustine, certainly constituted a part of the collections known under the general name of "Rules of the Fathers" and used by the founders of monasteries as a basis for the practices of the religious life. It does not seem to have been adopted by the regular communities of canons or of clerks which began to be organised in the eighth and ninth centuries. The rule given them by Saint Chrodegang, Bishop of Metz (742–766), is almost entirely drawn from that of Saint Benedict, and no more decided traces of Augustinian influence are to be found in it than in the decisions of the Synods of Aachen (816–819), which may be considered the real constitutions of the canons Regular. For this influence we must await the foundation of the clerical or canonical communities established in the eleventh century for the effective counteracting of simony and clerical concubinage.

The religious life of the Bishop of Hippo was, for a long time, a matter of dispute between the Canons Regular and the Hermits of St. Augustine, each of these two families claiming him exclusively as its own. It was not so much the establishing of an historical fact as the settling of a claim of precedence that caused the trouble, and as both sides could not be in the right, the quarrel would have continued indefinitely had not the Pope Sixtus IV put an end by his Bull "Summum Silentium" (1484).

== Medieval adoption ==
By the eleventh century, various monks felt that the Rule of Saint Benedict (which had been the standard model for monastic life for the last five centuries) no longer satisfied the demands of a rapidly changing society, with its increasing urbanisation, growing literacy, and shifts in distribution of wealth and power. While in some cases this resulted in reforms aimed at restoring observance of the Benedictine Rule to its original purity, trimming away later additions, there also developed groups of clerics (or 'canons') living in community in a more rigorously ascetic lifestyle than that followed by the Rule of Saint Benedict, following the set of ancient texts known as the 'Rule of Saint Augustine'. These clerics were widely known as Canons Regular (in order to distinguish them from the traditional 'secular' canons who followed the older, Carolingian 'rule of Aachen'), 'Augustinian canons', 'canons of St Augustine', 'Austin canons' or 'Black canons'.

Adoption of the Rule of St Augustine subsequently spread rapidly through Western Europe. The early Victorine Canons embraced the Rule of St Augustine in 1113. In the year 1120, Norbert of Xanten chose the Rule of St Augustine as he founded the Premonstratensian Order. It was adopted by John of Matha in 1198 in founding the Trinitarian Order. At the Fourth Lateran Council (1215) it was accepted as one of the approved rules of the church. It was then adopted by the Dominican Order in 1216 when their order received papal recognition. It was also adopted by the Order of St Augustine in 1256, by the Order of Saint Paul the First Hermit in 1308 and by the Order of Mercy. By the fifteenth century there were over 4500 houses in Europe following the rule. Over 150 communities follow it today.
