= Amanda (wife of Aper) =

Aristocratic, religious woman in the late Antique period

Amanda was an aristocratic, religious woman in the late Antique period, known for her letter-exchanges; her dates of birth and death are unknown, but are possibly between the late fourth to the early fifth century.

== Spiritual life ==
Whilst Therasia of Nola embraced religious life alongside Paulinus, Amanda and Aper's partnership was different. In their case, Aper took a religious life, whilst his wife Amanda took on the 'worldly responsibilities' so he could focus on the spiritual. By supporting her husband's spiritual life practically, Amanda was also living a holy life, being “a safe tower on a steady rock [she] would defy the tempests” (Epistula 44, Paulinus of Nola). The form this took was being the manager of both their estates, a position of power for women during this period. She also had sole responsibility for the raising of their children. Amanda also provided "moral edification" to Aper and the religious purpose their marriage had moved to, through chasteness, and providing public support. Through her practicality Amanda enabled spiritual growth for her husband so he could become a religious leader - Paulinus wrote to them both in praise stating: "You have passed from your bodies into Christ's".

Amanda is held up as an example of how valuable secular support for religious life was and how women in the Late Roman world had financial agency within marriage.

== Marital life ==
Amanda was a correspondent and supporter of the church, through her marriage to Aper, a Roman provincial lawyer, governor and later monk. She built a religious life with her husband and was given advice by Paulinus of Nola and Therasia of Nola on how to build a religious partnership out of their marriage. Paulinus and Therasia wrote to Amanda and Aper offering them advice on their 'spiritual marriage' and it is likely the four had been friends prior to Paulinus and Therasia wholly embracing religious life.

== See also ==
- Therasia of Nola
