= Therasia of Nola =

Spanish Christian aristocrat and writer

Therasia (fl. 381 - 408–10) was a Christian aristocrat from Spain. Through her marriage to Paulinus of Nola, she encouraged his conversion to Christianity and was influential in the early church, co-writing epistles and co-patron of the cult of St Felix with her husband. She was St Augustine's first female correspondent and was praised by him for her holiness. Augustine gave Therasia and Paulinus the gift of a loaf of bread, potentially for use in the Eucharist.

== Early life ==
Therasia was born in Spain in the fourth century AD. She married Paulinus at a time soon after 381 AD, when he had moved to Gaul. Therasia was a wealthy and devout Christian of "irreproachable character", whose faith had a profound effect on her husband. By 389, Paulinus had also converted to Christianity and the couple moved to Spain.

Therasia was living with her husband in Spain between 389 and 394. They owned property together and it was her wealth that supported much of their life together. Shortly after the move to Spain, their only child, a son called Celsus, died aged 8 days old. The death of their son appears to have made them embrace a more ascetic and spiritual life and by 395 they had retreated to Paulinus' estates at Nola. It has been suggested that from this point on Therasia and Paulinus' marriage became platonic and they focused on a 'marriage of friendship'. Jerome of Stridon encouraged them in this self-denial through his correspondence with them.

== Religious life ==
Religious men in the late antique period wrote letters (epistles) to each other forming a fertile social network of debate. Women, such as Therasia were also part of that network of discussion, and also included: Melania the Elder, Paulina, Amanda and Galla. Educated women had huge influence in the expansion of the Christian church, particularly in encouraging husbands to convert.

Many ascetic communities were managed by "husband-and-wife" or "spiritual brother/sister" partnerships in the Late Antique period. It was here in Nola that Paulinus and Therasia wrote letters to other theologians together, founded a monastery and both became patrons of the cult of St Felix.

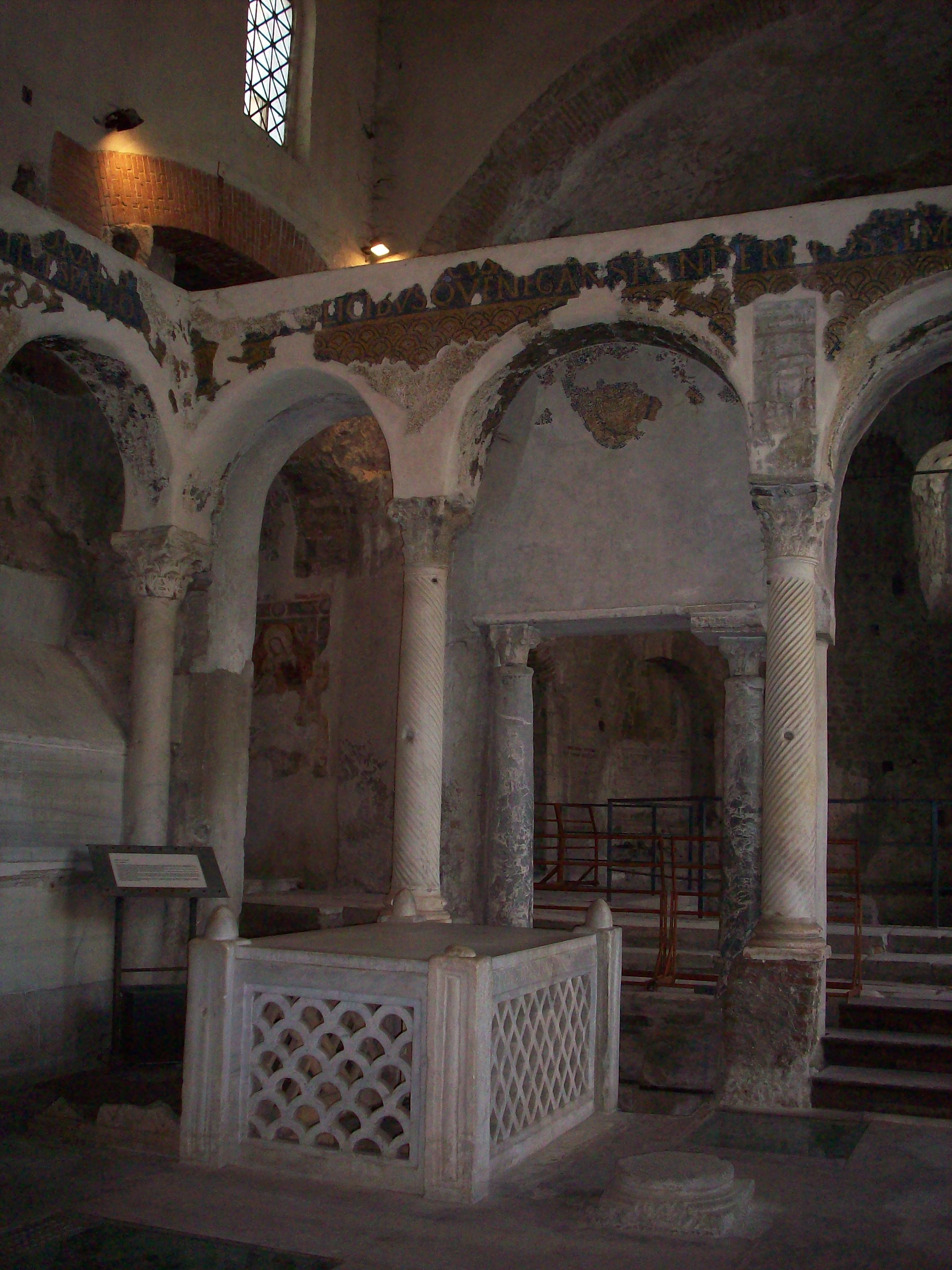
Cimitile tomb of Felix of Nola

Augustine praised the holiness of Therasia: "in te uno resalutamus" which translates as "in return, we salute her in you alone", meaning that although Therasia's holiness is praised - it is praised in terms of Paulinus' holiness.

Gifts were an important exchange between Christians. Therasia jointly gave the gift of a piece of the relic of the True Cross to Sulpicius to give thanks for the churches he had built. The relic had been given to Therasia and Paulinus by Melania the Elder. Augustine of Hippo gave the gift of a loaf of bread for eucharist to Therasia and Paulinus as a "token of unity" between them.

== Literary life ==
Therasia was co-author with her husband of several letters, including 'Epistles' 3–4, 6–7, 24, 26, 39–40, 43–5. She also corresponded with other religious figures alongside her husband, including being Augustine of Hippo's first female correspondent. Letters between them include: Epistula 24 to Alypius, Epistula 25 to Augustine, Epistula 30 to Augustine, received Epistula 31 from Augustine, Epistula 32 to Romanianus, Epistula 42 from Augustine, Epistula 45 from Augustine and Alypius, Epistula 80 from Augustine, Epistula 94 to Augustine, Epistula 95 from Augustine. She is also mentioned in Jerome's letters 58.2.6 and 118.5.

== Death ==
Therasia died between 408 and 10. After her death, Paulinus was ordained as Bishop of Nola. After his death they were interred in a double-tomb in the church of St Felix.
