= Nacéra Benseddik =

Algerian historian and archaeologist

- Born: 4 December 1949 (age 76); Bordj Bou Arreridj
- Education: Paris-Sorbonne
- Occupations: Epigrapher, archaeologist
- Employer: University of Algiers

Nacéra Benseddik (Arabic: نَصِيرة بِن صِدّيق, Naṣīrah Bin Ṣiddīq) is an Algerian historian, archaeologist and epigrapher. She was born in Bordj Bou Arreridj on 4 December 1949.

== Research ==
Benseddik's focusses on the classical and late Antique history and archaeology of Algeria. She has published widely on the subject through books and articles, as well as conference papers and editing Wikipedia. She is interested in interactions between Roman migrants and people already living in North Africa, particularly in the late Antique period. She is responsible for creating a critical edition of classical and medieval sources from and on Algeria, as part of the Centre Recherche en Anthropologie Sociale et Culturale (CRASC). As a curator, Benseddik contributed to the 2016 exhibition Made In Algeria, which was a collaboration between the Institut National d’Histoire de l’Art (INHA), the Bibliothèque Nationale de France (BnF) and the Musée des Civilisations de l’Europe et de la Méditerranée (MUCEM). She currently teaches at the University of Algiers. Her doctoral research was undertaken at Paris-Sorbonne, where she studied the cult of Aesculapius and his assimilation with the Punic god Eshmun and a Libyan healing deity.

=== Religious history and archaeology ===
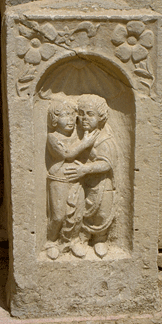
Stèle Saturne Timgad

Benseddik is notable for her research into the cult of Neptune, including identifying previously unknown monuments. This is part of her ongoing study into how the gods of the classical pantheon were adopted and adapted in North Africa - particularly Neptune and Aesculapius and their roles in cults of healing in North Africa. Her study of the site of Lambèse contributed to understanding of the cult of Aesculapius in greater detail. She has also studied the cult of Mercury and its relationship to trade.

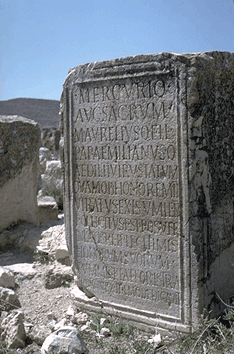
Zana: Stele dedicated to Mercury

=== Women's history ===
Benseddik is among the first to research women's lives in classical Algeria. In particular she is interested in how contemporary Roman and Greek writers have preserved snippets of information about the Berber women they encountered and these excerpts form some of the only surviving information we have about these African women's lives.

=== Frontiers ===
Benseddik studies how frontiers were created in Roman North Africa and has examined inscriptions that portray these points, for example at the fort at Touda. Dating to the third and fourth centuries AD, this site demonstrates that forts were important to regulate the trade that came across the Saharan plateau and the High Plains. She has written on the Limes Mauretaniae - a Roman frontier territory 100 km south of Algiers.

=== Augustinian archaeology ===
Benseddik has also studied the important site at Tagaste, where Augustine was born.

=== The history of museums in Algeria ===
Benseddik has also drawn together the histories of collecting antiquities in Algeria, and written a full history of museums within Algeria, and about it but abroad. An important contribution to this history is the role of the colonial military, which Benseddik has examined in detail.

== Bibliography ==
- Bibliographie de l’Algérie antique, CNRA, Alger 2016 (avec A. Bel Faïda).

=== Administrative and military organisation ===
- Les Troupes auxiliaires de l'armée romaine en Maurétanie Césarienne sous le Haut-Empire, Alger 1982.
- La ferme Romanette, Aïn Benia, Aïn bent Soltane: fortins ou fermes fortifiées, XIIth Intern. Congr. of Roman Frontier Studies, Stirling 1979, BAR, 1980, p. 977-99.
- Les Cimbriani à Sétif, Actes du I^{er} Coll. Intern. sur l'Hist. et l'Arch. de l'Afrique du Nord, Perpignan, 1981, C.T.H.S., 17b, 1981, p. 363-369.
- Notice limes dans E. Ruggiero, Dizionario Epigrafico di Antichità Romana, IV,43/3-43/4, Roma 1985, p. 1376/47 - 1376/67.
- Vsinaza (Saneg): nouveau témoignage de l'activité de P. Aelius Peregrinus Rogatus sur la praetentura de Césarienne, Atti del IX Convegno di Studio sull'Africa Romana, Sassari 1991 [1992], p. 425-437.
- L'Asclépieium de Lambèse et le culte d'Esculape en Numidie, Colloquium on North Africa from Antiquity to Islam, Bristol 1994 [1995], p. 16-23.
- Septime Sévère, P. Aelius Peregrinus Rogatus et la praetentura de Maurétanie Césarienne, in Les Frontières et les limites géographiques de l’Afrique du Nord antique, Centre de Recherche sur l’Antiquité Tardive et le Haut Moyen Age, Paris, mai 1997, p. 89-107.
- Lambaesis : un camp, un sanctuaire. Et la ville?, VIIIe Colloque International sur L'Histoire et l'Archéologie de l'Afrique du Nord, Tabarka, mai 2000, Tunis 2003, p. 165-179.
- Esculape, Hygie et la IIIe légion Auguste, XV° Convegno di Studio sull'Africa Romana, Tozeur, déc. 2002 [2004], p. 1365-1372.
- L'Asclépieium de Lambèse : Esculape, Hygie, Jupiter…. et le légat de la IIIe Légion Auguste, in Lieux de cultes : Aires votives, temples, églises, mosquées, Actes du IXe colloque intern. Sur l’histoire et l’archéologie de l’Afrique du Nord antique et médiévale (Tripoli 2005), Paris 2008, p. 119-128.
- Les Bavares transtagnenses peuple de Maurétanie césarienne, in Les auxiliaires de l’armée romaine. Des alliés aux fédérés (dir. C. Wolff et P. Faure), CEROR 51, Lyon 2016, p. 409-419 (avec J. P. Laporte).

=== Religious history ===
- Nouveau témoignage du culte de Tanit-Caelestis à Cherchel?, AntAfr, 20, 1984, p. 175-181.
- À propos de quelques stèles à Saturne du musée de Sétif, Actes du Colloque de Sétif, 7e suppl. au BAA, Alger 1993, p. 33-44.
- L'Asclépieium de Lambèse et le culte d'Esculape en Numidie, in North Africa from Antiquity to Islam, Bristol 1994 [1995], p. 16-23.
- Notice sur Esculape, Encyclopédie Berbère, t. XVIII, 1997, p. 2691-2698.
- Notice sur Iolaos, Encyclopédie Berbère, t. XXIV, p. 3767-3768.
- Notice sur l’incubation, Encyclopédie Berbère, t. XXIV, p. 3714-3718.
- Esculape, Hygie et la IIIe légion Auguste, XV Convegno di Studio sull'Africa Romana, Tozeur, déc. 2002 [2004], p. 1365-1372.
- Recherches sur les cultes guérisseurs dans le Maghreb antique, Archéologie du nord au sud du Sahara. 50 ans d’archéologie française, Paris 13-14 mai 2002 [2004], p. 183-188.
- Esculape et Hygie. Les cultes guérisseurs en Afrique, dans L’Afrique romaine du i^{er} siècle av. J.-C. au IVe s. ap. J.-C., Pallas 2005, p. 271-288.
- Saturne et ses fidèles : à propos de stèles de Cuicul, Mopth et Sitifis, Colloque international sur L’Algérie antique: permanences, relations, représentations, Identités et culture dans l'Algérie antique, Rouen avril 2003 [2005], p. 261-292 (en coll. avec C. Lochin).
- Le piémont nord de l’Aurès et les cultes chthoniens, Aouras 3, Paris 2006, p. 343-364.
- Deo patrio Saturno genitori augusto sacrum : iconographie du couple en Afrique, XVI° Convegno di Studio sull'Africa romana, Sassari 2006, p. 1785-1788.
- Thagaste (Souk-Ahras, Algérie). Glanes archéologiques, in L’Afrique chrétienne, Connaissance des Pères de l’Église, n°106, juin 2007, p. 14-26.
- Esculape, l'Afrique et la Grèce, Table ronde de Marne-la-Vallée D’Alexandrie à Tanger : multilinguisme et contacts culturels dans l’Afrique antique, 18 nov. 2005, Ktema, n°32, 2007, p. 193-206.
- L'Asclépieium de Lambèse : Esculape, Hygie, Jupiter…. et le légat de la IIIe Légion Auguste, in Lieux de cultes : Aires votives, temples, églises, mosquées, Actes du IXe colloque intern. Sur l’histoire et l’archéologie de l’Afrique du Nord antique et médiévale (Tripoli 2005), Paris 2008, p. 119-128.
- Les dieux de la Numidie Militaire, in Urbanisme et urbanisation en Numidie Militaire, Actes du colloque organisé les 7 et 8 mars 2008 par l'Université de Lyon 3, CEROR 34, 2009, p. 239-285.
- Esculape et Hygie en Afrique. Recherches sur les cultes guérisseurs, Mémoires de l'Académie des Inscriptions et Belles Lettres, t. 44, Paris 2010.
- Thagaste Souk Ahras, Patria di Sant'Augostino, Ortacesus 2010.
- Producteurs d'olives ou d'huile, voyageurs, militaires, commerçants: Mercure en Afrique, Atti del XVIII Convegno di Studio sull'Africa Romana, Sassari 2010, p. 527-545 (en coll. avec C. Lochin).
- A propos de quelques reliefs de Hit M'ghat (Aurès), Aouras 8, 2014, p. 199-221 (en coll. avec C. Lochin).
- Un autel à Neptune dans la région de Theueste (Tébessa, Algérie), dans Visions de l’Occident romain, Hommages à Yann Le Bohec, Paris 2012, p. 23-35.
- "Femmes en Afrique ancienne", Scripta antiqua, Ausonius, Bordeaux 2017.

221.

=== Economic and social life ===
- La pratique médicale en Afrique au temps d'Augustin, Atti del VI Convegno di Studio, Africa Romana, Sassari, 1988 [1989], p. 663-682.
- Être femme dans le Maghreb ancien, Awal, 20, 1999, p. 113-150.
- A la recherche de Thagaste, patrie de saint Augustin, Actes du Colloque International Augustin : Africanité et universalité, Alger-Annaba, avril 2001, Afer sum, Fribourg 2003, p. 413-436.
- Laßt die Hände nach Wolle greifen …, Antike Welt, hft 3, 2006, p. 23-30.
- Esculape, l'Afrique et la Grèce, D’Alexandrie à Tanger : multilinguisme et contacts culturels dans l’Afrique antique, Table ronde de l'Université de Marne-la-Vallée nov. 2005, Ktema, n°32, 2007, p. 193-206.
- Esculape et Hygie en Afrique. Recherches sur les cultes guérisseurs, Mémoires de l'Académie des Inscriptions et Belles Lettres, t. 44, Paris 2010.
- Thagaste Souk Ahras, Patria di Sant'Augostino, Ortacesus 2010.
- Femmes en Afrique ancienne, Scripta antiqua, Ausonius, Bordeaux 2017.

=== Urbanism ===
- De Caesarea à Shershel, Actes du IIe Coll. Intern. sur l'Hist. et l'Arch. de l'Afrique du Nord, Grenoble, 1983, C.T.H.S., 19b, 1983, p. 451-456.
- Nouvelles contributions à l'atlas archéologique de l'Algérie, Atti del VII Convegno di Studio sull'Africa Romana, Sassari 1989 [1990], p. 737-751.
- L’armée française en Algérie : « Parfois détruire, souvent construire », Atti del XIII Convegno di Studio sull'Africa Romana, Djerba 1998 [2000], p. 759-796.
- Chronique d’une cité antique, dans Alger. Lumières sur la ville, Actes du colloque de l’EPAU 4-6 mai 2001, Alger 2004, p. 29-34.
- Lambaesis: un camp, un sanctuaire. Et la ville?, VIIIe Colloque International sur L'Histoire et l'Archéologie de l'Afrique du Nord, Tabarka, mai 2000, Tunis 2003, p. 165-179.
- Lueurs cirtéennes, Zeitschrift für Papyrologie und Epigraphik, bd 153, 2005, p. 249-260.
- Autour de Rapidum, in L'Afrique, la Gaule, la Religion à l'époque romaine, Mélanges à la mémoire de Marcel Le Glay, Latomus, Bruxelles, 1994, p. 195-203.
- Cirta-Constantina et son territoire, Errance, Arles 2012.

=== Icononography ===
- La fouille du forum de Cherchel: rapport préliminaire avr.-oct. 1977, 4e suppt au Bulletin d'Archéologie Algérienne,(avec T. W. Potter), Alger 1986.
- La fouille du forum de Cherchel: 1977-1981, (avec T. W. Potter), Alger 1993.
- À propos de quelques stèles à Saturne du musée de Sétif, actes du Colloque de Sétif, 7e suppl. au B.A.A, Alger 1993, p. 33-44.
- La corona laurea et gemmata au Musée National des Antiquités (ex-Stéphane Gsell), Annales du Musée d’Alger, 6, 1998, p. 1-42.
- Esculape et Hygie: Classicisme et originalité, Hommage à G. Souville, AntAfr, 33, 1997, [1998], p. 143-154.
- Saturne et ses fidèles : à propos de stèles de Cuicul, Mopth. et Sitifis, Colloque international sur L’Algérie antique: permanences, relations, représentations, Identités et culture dans l'Algérie antique, Rouen avril 2003 [2005], p. 261-292 (avec C. Lochin).
- Deo patrio Saturno genitori augusto sacrum : iconographie du couple en Afrique, XVI° convegno internazionale di studi sull’Africa romana, Rabat 15-19 décembre 2004, Sassari 2006, p. 1785-1788.
- Esculape et Hygie en Afrique. Recherches sur les cultes guérisseurs, Mémoires de l'Académie des Inscriptions et Belles Lettres, t. 44, Paris 2010.
- Thagaste Souk Ahras, Patria di Sant'Augostino, Ortacesus 2010.
- Cirta-Constantina et son territoire, Errance, Arles 2012.

=== Epigraphy ===
- « Les inscriptions de Saldae », BAA V, 1971–74, pp. 207–222 (avec Ph. Leveau et F. Roumane).
- « Nouvelles inscriptions de Sétif », BAA VII, 1977–79, p. 33-52
- « Note d'épigraphie sétifienne », Xe Cong. Intern. d'Epigr. Grecq.et Lat., Nîmes 1992, BCTH, t. 23, 1990-1992, [1994], p. 177-182.
- « À propos de C.I.L. VIII, 9228 », L'Africa Romana, Carthage, 1994 [1996], p. 1369-1370.
- « Lambèse : l’archéologie de bulldozer », Zeitschrift für Papyrologie und Epigraphik, 135, 2001, p. 287-295.
- Lueurs cirtéennes, Zeitschrift für Papyrologie und Epigraphik, bd 153, 2005, p. 249-260.
- « Lateinische Epigraphik und Ideologien : der Fall Algerien », Archäologie und Epigraphik. Ein Dia-log zum 150jährigen Bestehen des Corpus Inscriptionum Latinarum, Berlin 21-22 nov. 2003, Archäologischer Anzeiger, hb 1, 2006, p. 61-71.
- Le piémont nord de l’Aurès et les cultes chthoniens, Aouras 3, Paris 2006, p. 343-364.
- Esculape et Hygie en Afrique. Recherches sur les cultes guérisseurs, Mémoires de l'Académie des Inscriptions et Belles Lettres, t. 44, Paris 2010.
- Thagaste Souk Ahras, Patria di Sant'Agostino, Ortacesus 2010.
- Cirta-Constantina et son territoire, Errance, Arles 2012.

=== Numismatics ===
- La fouille du forum de Cherchel: rapport préliminaire avr.-oct. 1977, 4e suppt au Bulletin d'Archéologie Algérienne, (avec T.W.Potter), Alger, 1986.
- La fouille du forum de Cherchel: 1977-1981, (avec T.W. Potter), Alger, 1993.

=== Sites ===
- Cherchel (avec Ph.Leveau et S.Ferdi), Alger 1983.
- La fouille du forum de Cherchel: rapport préliminaire avr.-oct. 1977, 4e suppt au Bulletin d'Archéologie Algérienne,(avec T. W. Potter), Alger 1986.
- La fouille du forum de Cherchel: 1977-1981, (avec T. W. Potter), Alger 1993.
- Thagaste. Souk Ahras, Patrie de saint Augustin, Alger 2005.
- Thagaste Souk Ahras, Patria di Sant'Agostino, Ortacesus 2010.
- Cirta-Constantina et son territoire, Editions Errance, Arles 2012.

=== Sixth to seventh century: African Christians, vandal Africa and Byzantium ===
- « De Caesarea à Shershel », Actes du IIe Coll. Intern. sur l'Hist. et l'Arch. de l'Afrique du Nord, Grenoble, 1983, C.T.H.S., 19b, 1983, p. 451-456.
- « La pratique médicale en Afrique au temps d'Augustin », Atti del VI Convegno di Studio, Africa Romana, Sassari, 1988 [1989], p. 663-682.
- « Autels votifs de la région de Sétif: païens ou chrétiens? », Monuments funéraires, institutions autochtones en Afrique du Nord antique et médiévale, VIe Colloque International sur L'Histoire et l'Archéologie de l'Afrique du Nord, Pau, 1993, C.T.H.S. [1995], p. 179-186.

=== Museums and colonialism ===
- Du Musée Africain du Louvre au Musée National des Antiquités, Les 3^{e} rencontres du numérique, Palais du Bey, Constantine 31 mai 2015.
- Histoire coloniale. Les tribulations des collections archéologiques du Musée National des Antiquités, Libyan Studies, Cambridge University Press: 23 April 2019, pp. 1–13.
