= Paulinus of Nola =

Christian bishop and saint

Saint Paulinus of Nola
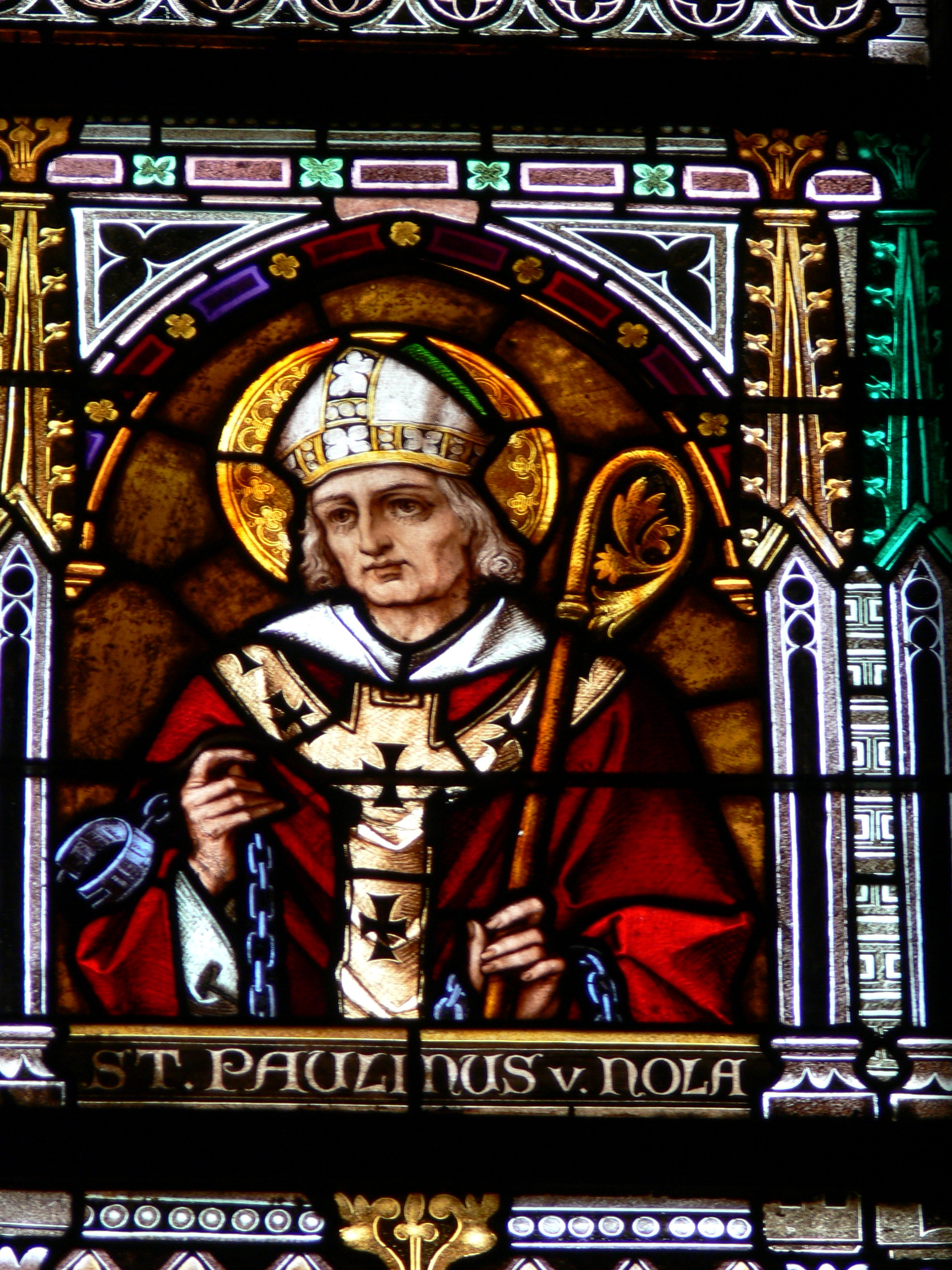

Bishop and Confessor
- Born: 22 June 354; Burdigala, Gallia Aquitania, Roman Empire
- Died: 22 June 431 (aged 76–77); Nola in Campania, the Praetorian prefecture of Italy, Western Roman Empire
- Venerated in: Anglican Communion; Catholic Church; Eastern Orthodox Church; Oriental Orthodox Churches
- Feast: Anglican tradition: 22 June (memorial); Catholicism: 22 June; Eastern Orthodoxy: 23 January; and 22 June; Oriental Orthodox Churches: 8 September

Paulinus of Nola (/pɔːˈlaɪnəs/; Latin: Paulinus Nolanus; also anglicized as Pauline of Nola; c. 354 – 22 June 431) born Pontius Meropius Anicius Paulinus, was a Roman poet, writer, senator, and bishop. He attained the ranks of suffect consul (c. 377) and governor of Campania, (c. 380 – c. 381) but, prompted by the counsels of his Hispanic wife Therasia of Nola and by the assassination of the emperor Gratian, abandoned his career and was baptized as a Christian. Later, probably after Therasia's death, he became bishop of Nola in Campania. While there, he wrote poems in honor of his predecessor Saint Felix and corresponded with other Christian leaders throughout the empire. He is credited with the introduction of bells to Christian worship and helped resolve the disputed election of Pope Boniface I.

His renunciation of his wealth and station in favor of an ascetic and philanthropic life was held up as an example by many of his contemporaries—including Augustine, Jerome, Martin, and Ambrose—and he was subsequently venerated as a saint. His relics became a focus of pilgrimage, but were removed from Nola sometime between the 11th and 20th centuries. His feast day is observed on 22 June in both the Roman Catholic and Eastern Orthodox Churches. In Nola, the entire week around his feast day is celebrated as the Festival of the Lilies.

== Life ==
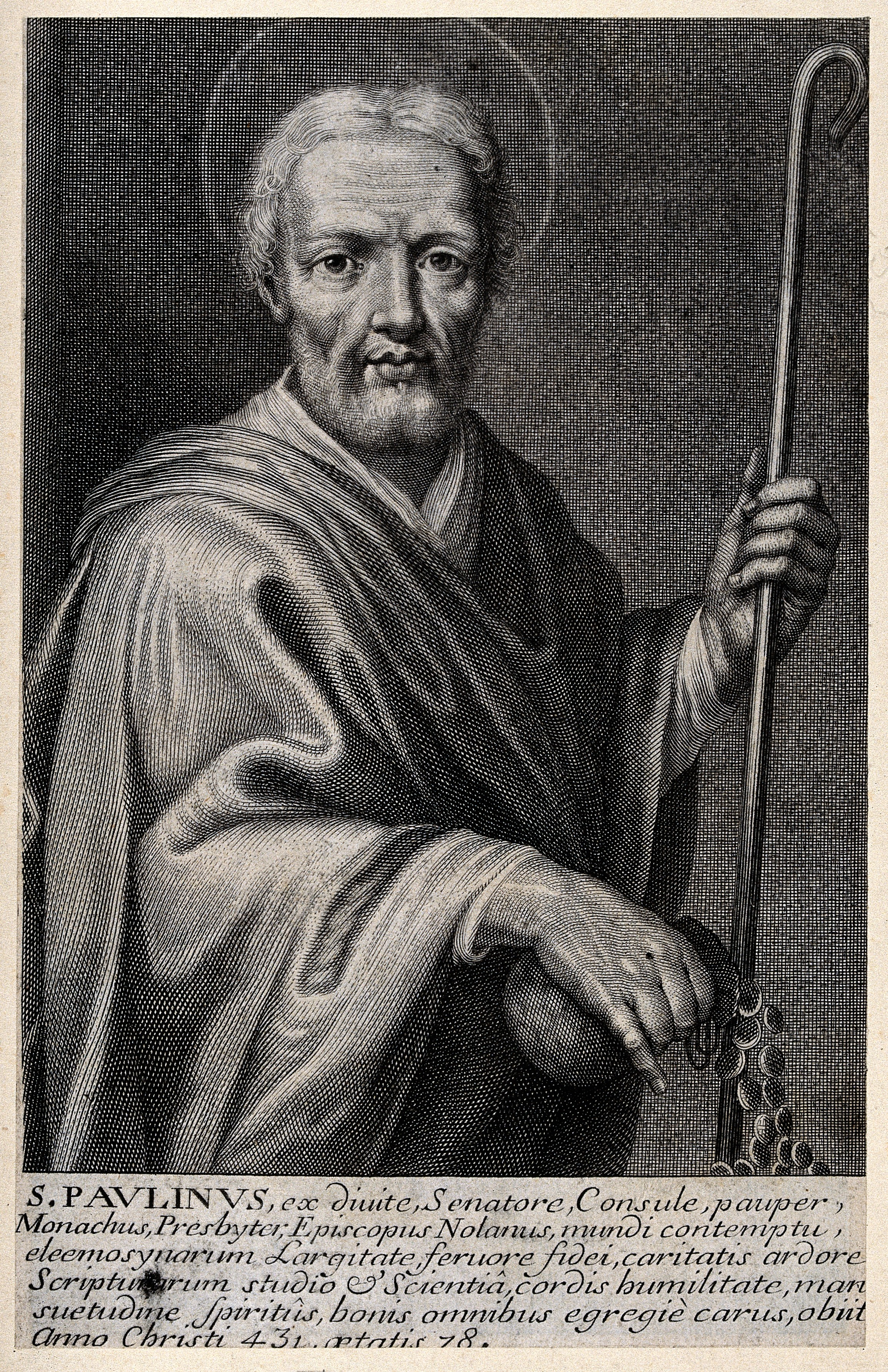
Line engraving of Saint Paulinus of Nola

Pontius Meropius Paulinus was born c. 352 at Bordeaux, in southwestern France. He was from a notable senatorial family with estates in the Aquitaine province of France, northern Iberia, and southern Italy. Paulinus was a kinsman of Melania the Elder. He was educated in Bordeaux by his teacher, the poet Ausonius.

At some time during his boyhood he made a visit to the shrine of St Felix at Nola near Naples.

His normal career as a young member of the senatorial class did not last long. In 375, the Emperor Gratian succeeded his father Valentinian. Gratian made Paulinus suffect consul at Rome c. 377, and appointed him governor of the southern Italian province of Campania c. 380. Paulinus noted the Campanians' devotion to Saint Felix of Nola and built a road for pilgrims, as well as a hospice for the poor near the local shrine.

In 383 Gratian was assassinated at Lyon, France, and Paulinus went to Milan to attend the school of Ambrose. Around 384 he returned to Bordeaux. There he married Therasia, a Christian noblewoman from Barcelona. Paulinus was threatened with the charge of having murdered his brother. It is possible that an attempt was made to accuse him in order to confiscate his property. He was baptized by Bishop Delphinus of Bordeaux. He and his wife traveled to Iberia about 390. When they lost their only child eight days after birth they decided to withdraw from the world, and live a secluded religious life. Paulinus was close to both Pelagius and to the Pelagian writer Julian of Eclanum.

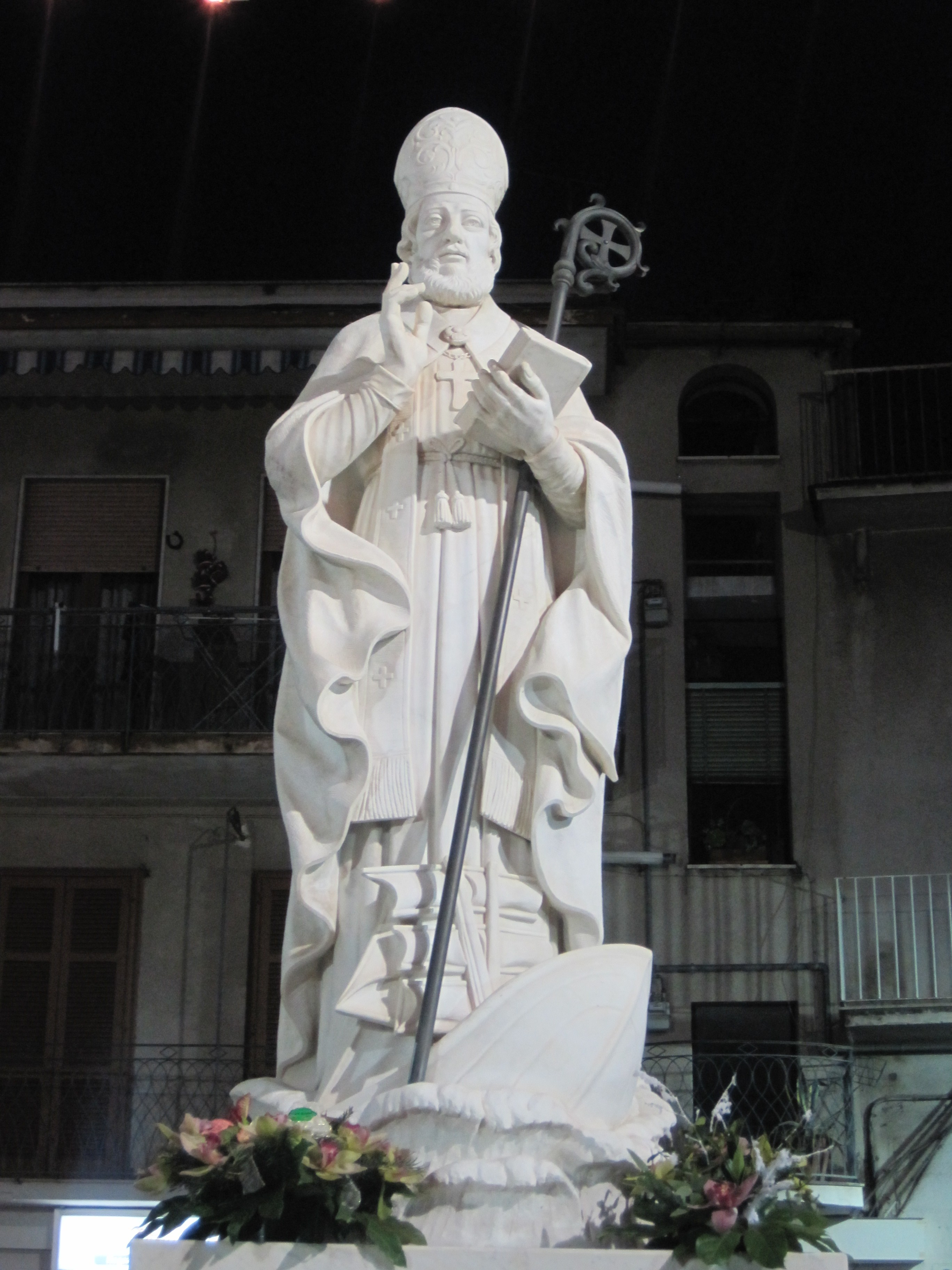
Statue of St. Paulinus in Nola

In 393 or 394, after some resistance from Paulinus, he was ordained a presbyter on Christmas Day by Lampius, Bishop of Barcelona. (This was similar to what had happened with Augustine of Hippo, who had been ordained against his protestations in the year 391 at the behest of a crowd cooperating with Bishop Valerius in the north African city of Hippo Regius.) However, there is some debate as to whether the ordination was canonical, since Paulinus received ordination "at a leap" (per saltum), without receiving minor orders first.

Paulinus refused to remain in Barcelona, and in late spring of 395 he and his wife moved from Iberia to Nola in Campania where he remained until his death. Paulinus credited his conversion to Saint Felix, who was buried in Nola, and each year would write a poem in honor of him.

The great building works undertaken by Paulinus in 402–403 were the crowning glory and ornament of the renovated Nola. He restored and improved the ancient basilica erected in the martyr's honour. He and Therasia also rebuilt a church commemorating Saint Felix, of great size and richly decorated, a monument of Christian art, with magnificent porticoes and fountains, for which a copious supply of water was brought from nearby Avella. Great crowds of pilgrims flocked to the martyr's tomb.

In January 406, during the peace which followed the defeat of Radagaisus, Paulinus hosted a circle of guests which included Melania the Younger, her husband, her mother Albina, and many other Christians such as the Bishop of Beneventum; Melania and all her household stayed on until sometime before 408.

During these years Paulinus engaged in considerable epistolary dialogue with Jerome among others about monastic topics. "Paulinus decided to invest his money for the poor and the church rather than rejecting it completely, which stands in contrast to other more severe contemporary views such as Jerome's".

Therasia died some time between 408 and 410, and shortly afterwards Paulinus received episcopal ordination. Around 410, Paulinus was chosen Bishop of Nola, where he served for twenty years. Like a growing number of aristocrats in the late 4th and early 5th centuries who were entering the clergy rather than taking up the more usual administrative careers in the imperial service, Paulinus spent a great deal of his money on his chosen church, city and ritual.

Paulinus died at Nola on 22 June 431. The following year the presbyter Uranus wrote his "On the Death of Paulinus" (De Obitu Paulini), an account of the death and character of Paulinus.

== Influence ==
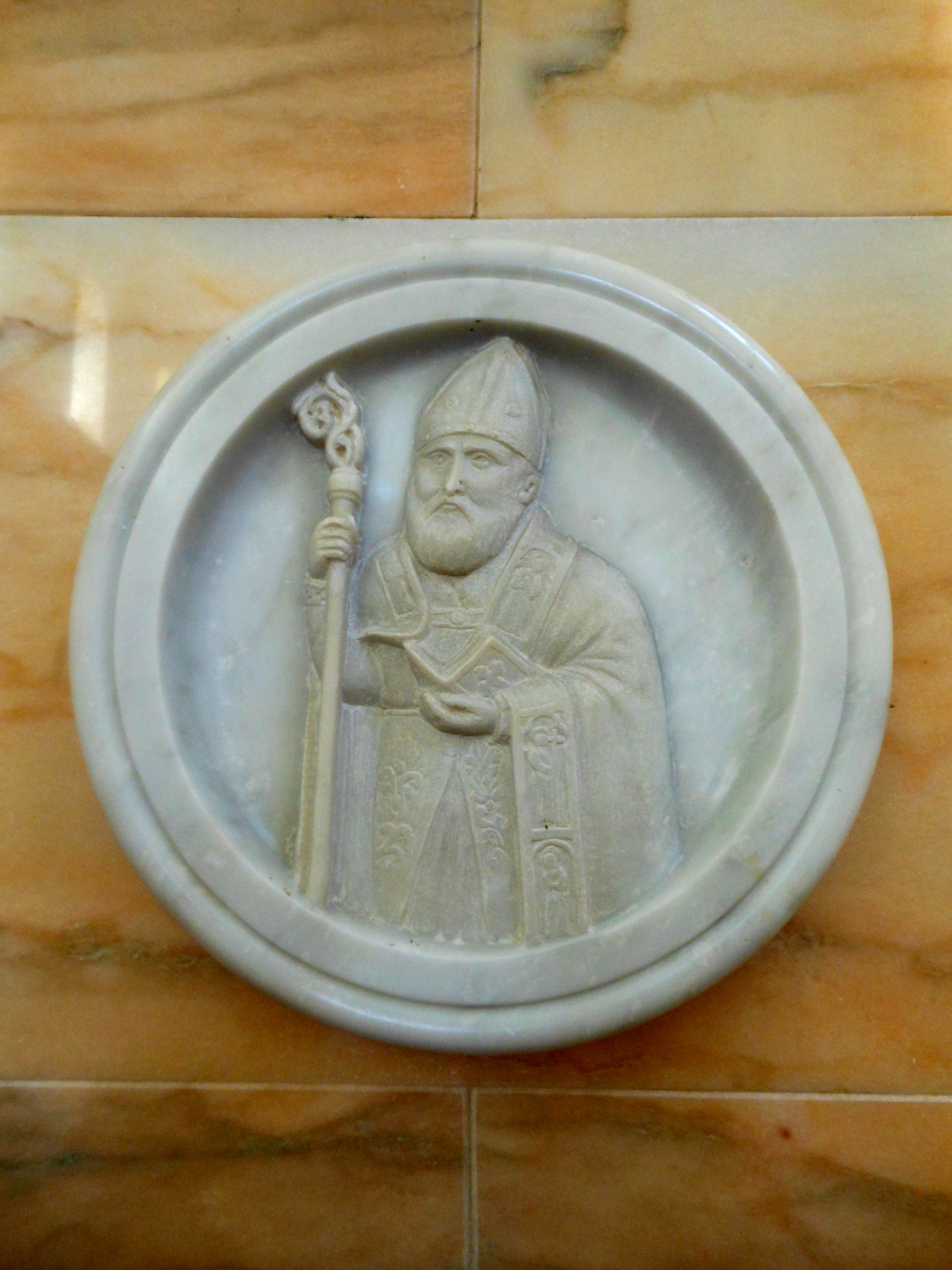
Bas-relief of Saint Paulinus in Torregrotta

As bishop of Nola, Paulinus is traditionally credited with the introduction of the use of bells in church services. One form of medieval handbell was known as the nola and medieval steeple bells were known as campanas from this supposed origin. However, Dr. Adolf Buse, professor at the Seminary of Cologne, showed that the use of bells in churches, an invention credited to Paulinus by tradition, is not due to him, nor even to the town of Nola.

Already during his governorship Paulinus had developed a fondness for the 3rd-century martyr, Felix of Nola. Felix was a minor saint of local importance and patronage whose tomb had been built within the local necropolis at Cimitile, just outside the town of Nola. As governor, Paulinus had widened the road to Cimitile and built a residence for travelers; it was at this site that Paulinus and Therasia took up residence. Nearby were a number of small chapels and at least one old basilica. Paulinus rebuilt the complex, constructing a brand new basilica to Felix and gathering to him a small monastic community. Paulinus wrote an annual hymn (natalicium) in honor of Saint Felix for the feast day when processions of pilgrims were at their peak. In these hymns we can understand the personal relationship Paulinus felt between himself and Felix, his advocate in heaven. His poetry shares with much of the work of the early 5th century an ornateness of style that classicists of the 18th and 19th centuries found cloying and dismissed as decadent, though Paulinus' poems were highly regarded at the time and used as educational models.

Many of Paulinus's letters to his contemporaries, including Ausonius and Sulpicius Severus in southern Gaul, Victricius of Rouen in northern Gaul, and Augustine in Africa, are preserved. Four letters from Paulinus to Augustine survive, and eight from Augustine to Paulinus. In one, Augustine invites Paulinus to visit Africa. As a publishing technique at that time, Augustine often sent copies of his works to Paulinus, to be copied and circulated in Italy. Paulinus may have been indirectly responsible for Augustine's Confessions: Paulinus wrote to Alypius, Bishop of Thagaste and a close friend of Augustine, asking about his conversion and taking up of the ascetic life. Alypius's autobiographical response does not survive; Augustine's ostensible answer to that query is the Confessions. Paulinus also wrote five letters to Delphinus and six to Amandus of Bordeaux.

"Paulinus' surviving letters and poems, many devoted to the feast day of Felix, reveal his attitudes and values, illuminate his social and spiritual relationships, preserve vivid traces of the literary and aesthetic evolution of Latin literature under the influence of Christian ideas, and document the emergence of the late antique cult of the saints."

We know about his buildings in honor of Saint Felix from literary and archaeological evidence, especially from his long letter to Sulpicius Severus describing the arrangement of the building and its decoration. He includes a detailed description of the apse mosaic over the main altar and gives the text for a long inscription he had written to be put on the wall under the image. By explaining how he intended the visitors to understand the image over the altar, Paulinus provided rare insight into the intentions of a patron of art in the later Empire. He explained his project in a Poem dedicated to another great catechist, St Nicetas of Remesiana, as he accompanied him on a visit to his basilicas: "I now want you to contemplate the paintings that unfold in a long series on the walls of the painted porticos. ... It seemed to us useful to portray sacred themes in painting throughout the house of Felix, in the hope that when the peasants see the painted figure, these images will awaken interest in their astonished minds."

In later life Paulinus, by then a highly respected church authority, participated in multiple church synods investigating various ecclesiastical controversies of the time, including Pelagianism.

== Legend ==
Gregory the Great recounts a popular story that alleges that when the Vandals raided Campania, a poor widow came to Paulinus for help when her only son had been carried off by the son-in-law of the Vandal king. Having exhausted his resources in ransoming other captives, Paulinus said, "Such as I have I give thee", and went to Africa to exchange places with the widow's son. There Paulinus was accepted in place of the widow's son, and employed as gardener. After a time the king found out that his son-in-law's slave was the great Bishop of Nola. He at once set him free, granting him also the freedom of all the captive townsmen of Nola. According to Pope Benedict XVI, "the historical truth of this episode is disputed, but the figure of a Bishop with a great heart who knew how to make himself close to his people in the sorrowful trials of the barbarian invasions lives on."

== Relics ==
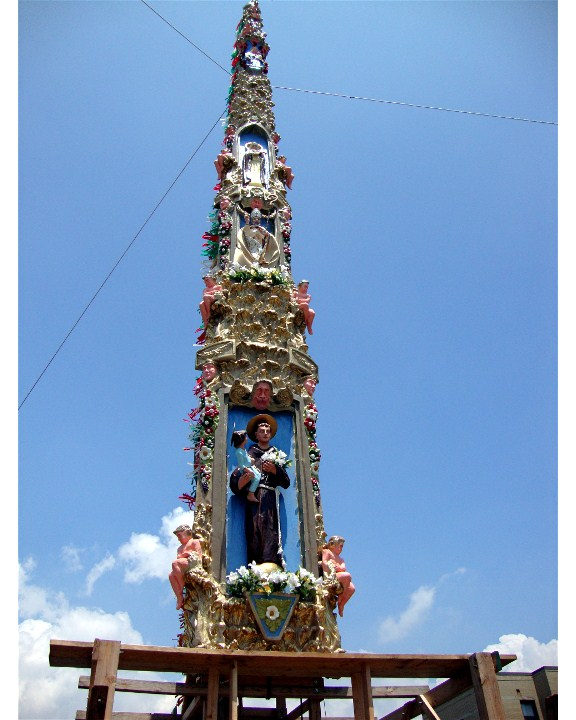
Giglio in Franklin Square, New York City, 2011

In about 800 Prince Grimoald III of Benevento removed Paulinus's bones as relics.

From the 11th century they rested at the church of Saint Adalbert, now Saint Bartholomew, on the island in the Tiber in Rome. In 1908 Pope Pius X permitted them to be translated to the new cathedral at Nola, where they were reinterred on 15 May 1909.

The bones are now found in the small Sicilian city of Sutera, where they dedicate a feast day, and conduct a procession for the saint at Easter each year.

== Modern devotion to Saint Paulinus ==
The people of modern-day Nola and the surrounding regions remain devoted to Saint Paulinus. His feast day is celebrated annually in Nola during La Festa dei Gigli (the Feast of the Lilies), in which Gigli and several large statues in honor of the saint, placed on towers, are carried upon the shoulders of the faithful around the city. In the United States the descendants of Italian immigrants from Nola and Brusciano continue the tradition in Brooklyn. This proud tradition is also kept alive in East Harlem, held on Giglio Way by the Giglio Society of East Harlem and on Long Island in West Hempstead with the Sons of San Paulino di Nola.

Paulinus is also venerated in the Eastern Orthodox Church, where his feast day commemorated on 23 January.

== General and cited references ==
- Ausonius, & Paulinus of Nola, Ausone et Paulin de Nole : Correspondance, tr. D. Amherdt (2004) [Latin text; French translation]. Introduction, Latin text, French translation & notes. Bern: Peter Lang Publ., 2004 (Sapheneia, Beiträge zur Klassischen Philologie; 9) VII, 247 p. ISBN 3-03910-247-8
- Catherine Conybeare, Paulinus Noster Self and Symbols in the Letters of Paulinus of Nola (2000)
- Gardner, Edmund G., ed. (1911). The Dialogues of Saint Gregory the Great. Merchantville, NJ: Evolution Publishing. ISBN 978-1-889758-94-7. Chapter III of the Dialogues contains a long anecdote about Paulinus.
- C. Iannicelli, "Rassegna di studi paoliniani" (1980–1997), in Impegno e Dialogo 11 (1994–1996) [publish. 1997], pp. 279–321 Rassegna Iannicelli
- J. T. Lienhard, "Paulinus of Nola and Early Western Monasticism, with a Study of the Chronology of His Work and an Annotated Bibliography", 1879–1976 (Theophaneia 28) (Köln-Bonn 1977), pp. 192–204.
- C. Magazzù, 'Dieci anni di studi su Paolino di Nola' (1977–1987), in Bollettino di studi latini 18 (1988), pp. 84–103.
- J. Morelli, De S. Paulini Nolani Doctrina Christologica (Theology doctorate dissertation, Pontificia Facultas Theologica Neapolitana apud Majus Seminarium, ex Typographica Officina Forense, Neapoli, 1945)
- Paulinus of Nola, Letters of St Paulinus of Nola translated ... by P. G. Walsh, 2 vols., 1966–7 (Ancient Christian Writers, 35–36). ISBN 9780809100880, 9780809100897.
- Paulinus of Nola, The Poems of Paulinus of Nola translated ... by P. G. Walsh), 1975 (Ancient Christian Writers, 40). ISBN 9780809101979.
- Paulinus of Nola, Paolino di Nola Le Lettere. Testo latino con introduzione, traduzione italiana ..., ed. G. Santaniello (2 vols., 1992)
- Paulinus of Nola, Paolino di Nola I Carmi ..., ed. A. Ruggiero (1996)
- Paulinus of Nola, Sancti Pontii Meropii Paulini Nolani Opera, ed. G. de Hartel (2nd. ed. cur. M. Kamptner, 2 vols., 1999) [v. 1. Epistulae; v. 2. Carmina. Latin texts]
- Paulinus Nolanus, Carmina, ed. F. Dolveck (2015). Corpus Christianorum. Series Latina 21. Turnhout: Brepols Publishers. ISBN 978-2-503-55807-3.
- Trout, Dennis E (1999). Paulinus of Nola—Life, Letters, and Poems. Berkeley: University of California Press. ISBN 978-0-520-21709-6.
