= Nola Cathedral =

Cathedral in Nola, Italy

Coordinates: 40.9259°N 14.5282°E

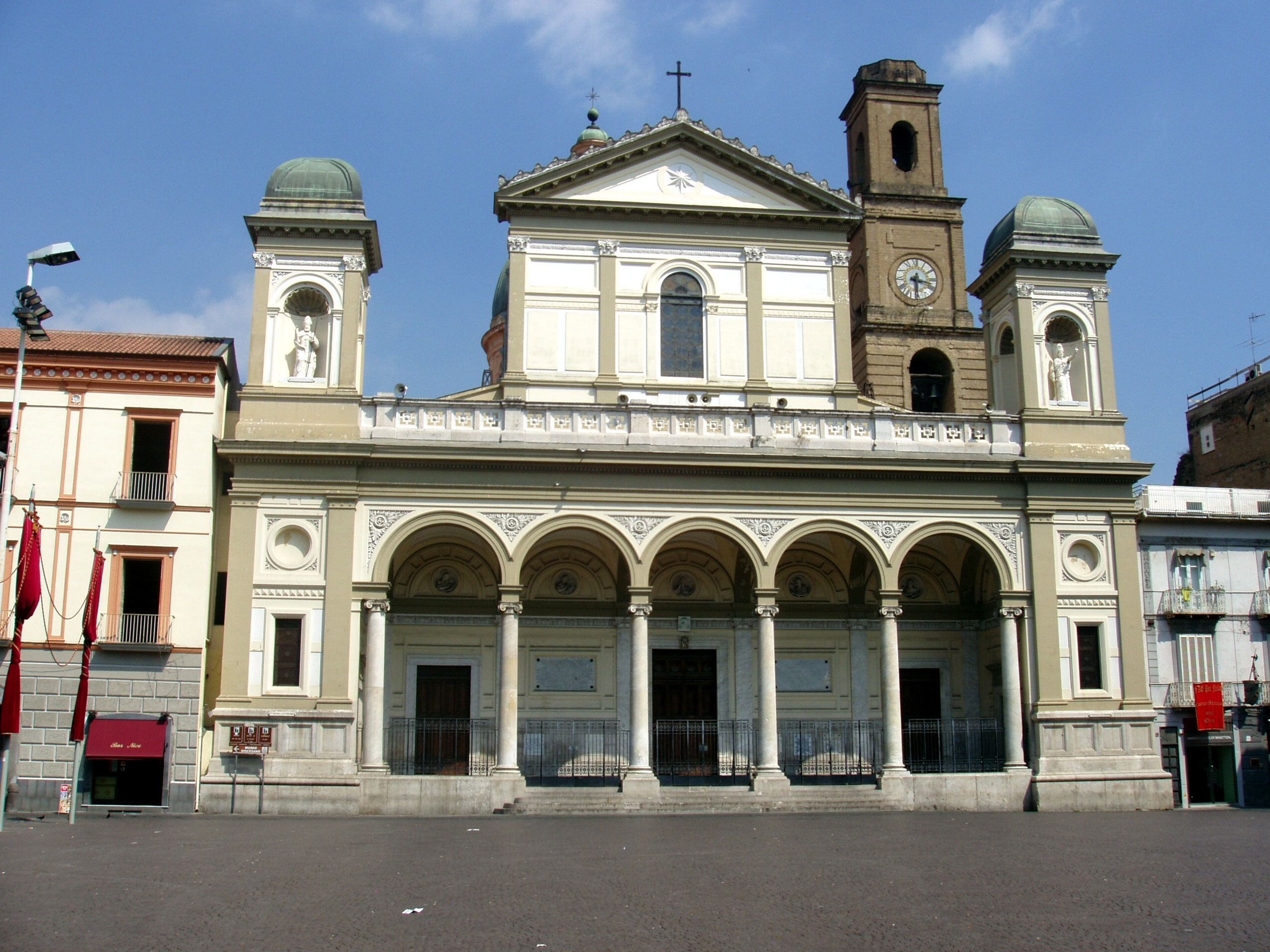
West front of the cathedral

Nola Cathedral (Italian: Cattedrale di Nola; Duomo di Nola; Cattedrale di Santa Maria Assunta) is a Roman Catholic cathedral in Nola, a municipality within Naples in Campania, Italy, dedicated to the Assumption of the Virgin Mary. It is the episcopal seat of the Diocese of Nola. It was granted the status of a minor basilica in March 1954.

== History ==
There was probably a palaeochristian church on the site, as a chapel was founded around the tomb of Saint Felix of Nola, a martyred bishop of the region. It was reconstructed in a Gothic style in the 1370s under the patronage of Count Niccolò Orsini and was consecrated to "the Blessed Virgin and the Saints Felix of Nola and Paulinus" (Felice Martire e Paolino). The crypt has traces of the older building. It was rebuilt over the centuries, particularly in 1583, and in 1861 after a serious fire; on the last occasion it was reconstructed in a Neoclassical style. Among the artists and architects involved were Nicola Breglia, Salvatore Cepparullo and Paolo Vetri. It was completed in 1909.

With the reconsecration, the relics of Saint Felix were brought back to the cathedral. In the 9th or 10th century they had been removed by the Lombards from a church in Cimitile to Benevento Cathedral, and from there in the 11th century to San Bartolomeo sull'Isola Tiberina in Rome.

The tomb in the crypt is supposed to have a Miracle of Manna occurring as a substance oozes out of the tomb of the saint.
