= Felix of Nola =

Italian Roman Catholic saint

Saint Felix of Nola
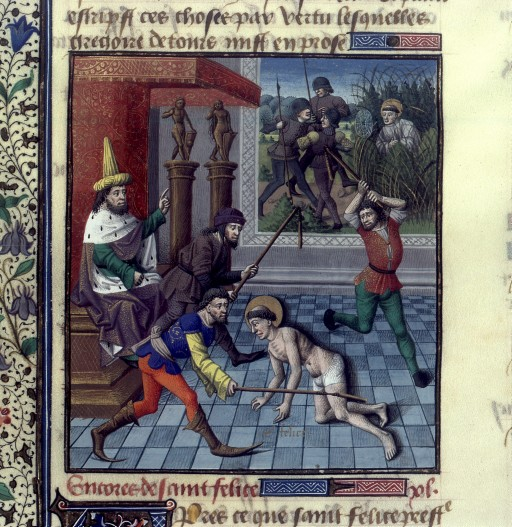
- Saint Felix of Nola beaten and hidden by a spider's web

Martyr
- Born: c. early 3rd century Nola, Campania, Italy
- Died: c. 260; Nola, Campania, Italy
- Venerated in: Catholic Church Orthodox Church
- Canonized: Pre-Congregation
- Feast: 14 January

Felix of Nola (died c. 260) was a Christian priest at Nola near Naples in Italy. He sold off his possessions to give to the poor, but was arrested and tortured for his Christian faith during the persecution of Roman Emperor Decius (r. 249–251). He was believed to have died a martyr's death during the persecution of Decius or Valerian (c. 253) but is now listed in the General Roman Calendar as a Confessor of the Faith who survived his tortures.

== Life ==
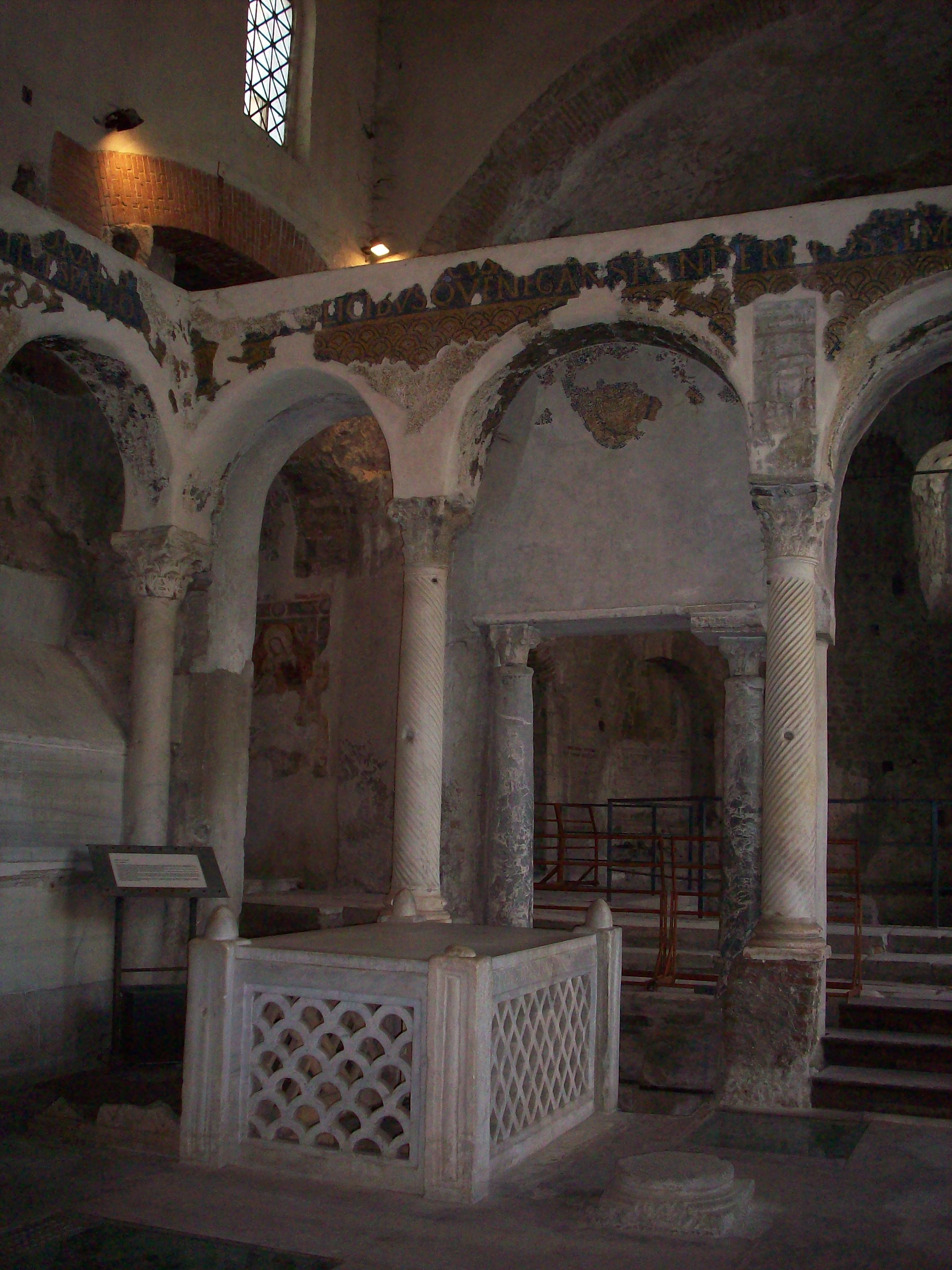
Burial place of Felix of Nola in Cimitile

Felix was the elder son of Hermias, a Syrian centurion who had retired to Nola, Italy. After his father's death, Felix sold off most of his property and possessions, gave the proceeds to the poor, and pursued a clerical vocation. Felix was ordained by and worked with Saint Maximus of Nola.

When bishop Maximus fled to the mountains to escape the persecution of the Roman emperor Decius, Felix was arrested and beaten for his faith instead. He escaped prison, according to legend, being freed by an angel so that he could help bishop Maximus. Felix found Maximus alone, ill, and helpless and hid him from soldiers in a vacant building. When the two were safely inside, a spider quickly spun a web over the door, fooling the imperial forces into thinking it was long abandoned, and they left without finding the Christians. A subsequent attempt to arrest Felix followed, which he avoided by hiding in a ruined building where again spider web was spun across the entrance, convinced the soldiers the building was abandoned. The two managed to hide from authorities until the persecution ended with the death of Emperor Decius in 251.

After Maximus's death, the people wanted Felix to be the next bishop of Nola, but he declined, favouring Quintus, a "senior" priest who had seven days more experience than Felix. Felix himself continued as a priest. He also continued to farm his remaining land and gave most of the proceeds to people even poorer than himself.

Legend assigns to Felix a martyr's death either in the year 255 under Emperor Valerian (253–260) or, in another version, in the general persecution instigated by the Emperor Decius (249–251). According to Butler, Felix died in a good old age on the fourteenth of January.

Much of the little information about Felix comes from the letters and poetry of Paulinus of Nola. When peace was finally obtained, he returned home and, in poverty, lived a withdrawn life until old age, an unconquered confessor of the faith.

Five churches have been built at (or near) the place where he was first interred, which was without the precincts of the city of Nola. His precious remains are kept in the cathedral; but certain portions are at Rome, Benevento, and some other places. In time a new church in Nola was dedicated in the name of St Felix. People travelled from far away to see his burial place. His relics lie in Nola Cathedral. He is the patron saint of lost animals and spiders.
