= Alypius of Thagaste =

Lifelong friend of Augustine of Hippo

Saint Alypius of Thagaste
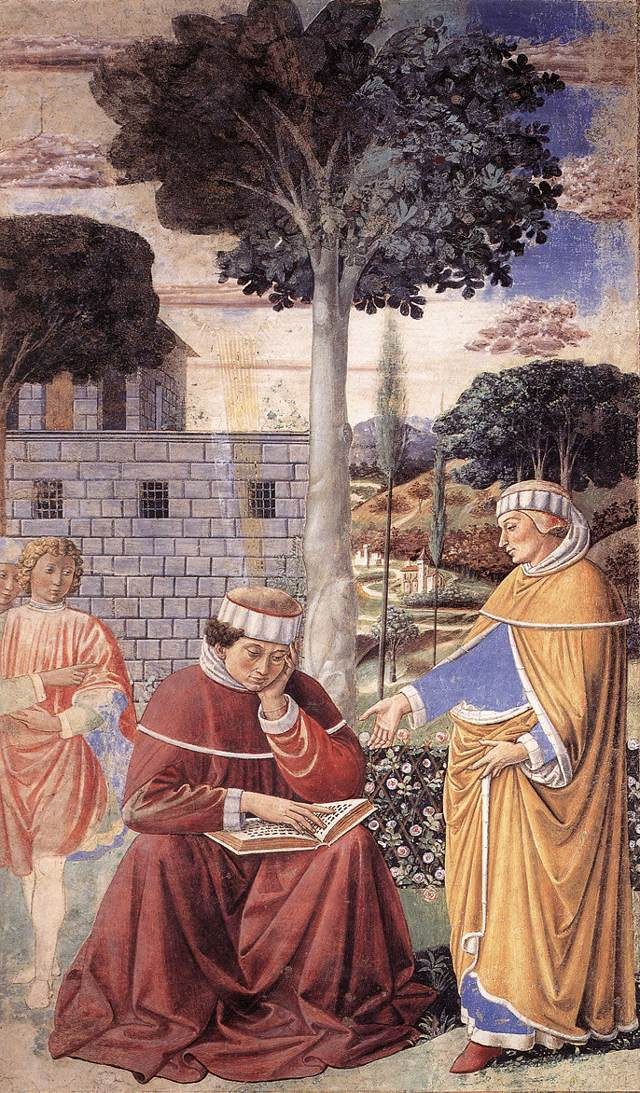
- "The Conversion of St. Augustine" (Gozzoli). The figure at right is probably Alypius.
- Born: 4th century
- Died: 5th century
- Venerated in: Roman Catholic Church; Eastern Orthodox Church
- Canonized: 1584 by Pope Gregory XIII
- Feast: 15 August

Alypius of Thagaste was bishop of the see of Thagaste (in present-day Algeria) in 394. He was a lifelong friend of Augustine of Hippo and joined him in his conversion (in 386; Confessions 8.12.28) and life in Christianity. He is credited with helping establish Augustine's monastery in Africa. Most of what is known about him comes from Augustine's autobiographical Confessions.

== Life ==
Alypius came from an aristocratic family of Thagaste, a small town in the Roman province of Africa Proconsularis. He was a student of Augustine's in Carthage. As Alypius’ friendship with Augustine began to deepen (Augustine called him the brother of his heart), so did his interest in Manicheism. Alypius admired the Manichees’ strict decrees on chastity, and believed that marriage would interfere with the search for wisdom with his friends.

He also studied law, and during his early life went to Rome, where he served as a magistrate. One commonly cited event, from the Confessions (6.8.13) concerns the young Alypius, who had extremely strong moral beliefs, being taken by friends to watch violent Roman games in the arena. He initially resisted this, keeping his eyes shut, but he was unable to control himself because of the sounds and eventually succumbed and opened his eyes. To his horror, he found himself enjoying the spectacle and even invited other friends to come with him later. However, he eventually repented of this and returned to the spiritual fold.

In 384 he joined Augustine in Milan, where he was exposed to the preaching of Ambrose. Alypius was present in the garden of Milan at Augustine’s conversion. He and Augustine were baptized by Ambrose at the Easter vigil in April 387.

After being baptized, he and Augustine returned to Thagaste, where he helped Augustine establish the first monastery in North Africa. When Augustine was made priest of Hippo, Alypius moved there and became a member of the monastic community Augustine founded there. In 394 Alypius became bishop of Thagaste after his return from the Holy Land, where he had seen Jerome.

The following year, he wrote Paulinus of Nola, requesting a copy of Eusebius' Ecclesiastical History. Paulinus, who was interested in what Alypius believed and taught, requested some particulars of his life. Alypius asked Augustine to write in response. According to John C. Kelly, this was the impetus behind Augustine's later Confessions. Alypius died around 430. He took part in the African Councils of the Catholic Church during his time as bishop, and was chosen along with Possidius and Augustine to represent the Catholic Bishops at the famous meeting with the Donatists in Carthage in 411. He took part in the Council of Milevi (Numidia) in 416. He composed a written report on this Council for Pope Innocent.

There is no record of his cultus, until he was added into the Roman Martyrology by Pope Gregory XIII in 1584. His feast day is August 15. Friars of the Augustinian Order celebrate his feast day in conjunction with Possidius on May 16, while the Canons Regular of St Augustine celebrate their joint feast day on August 17.
