= Thagaste =

Ancient city in Algeria

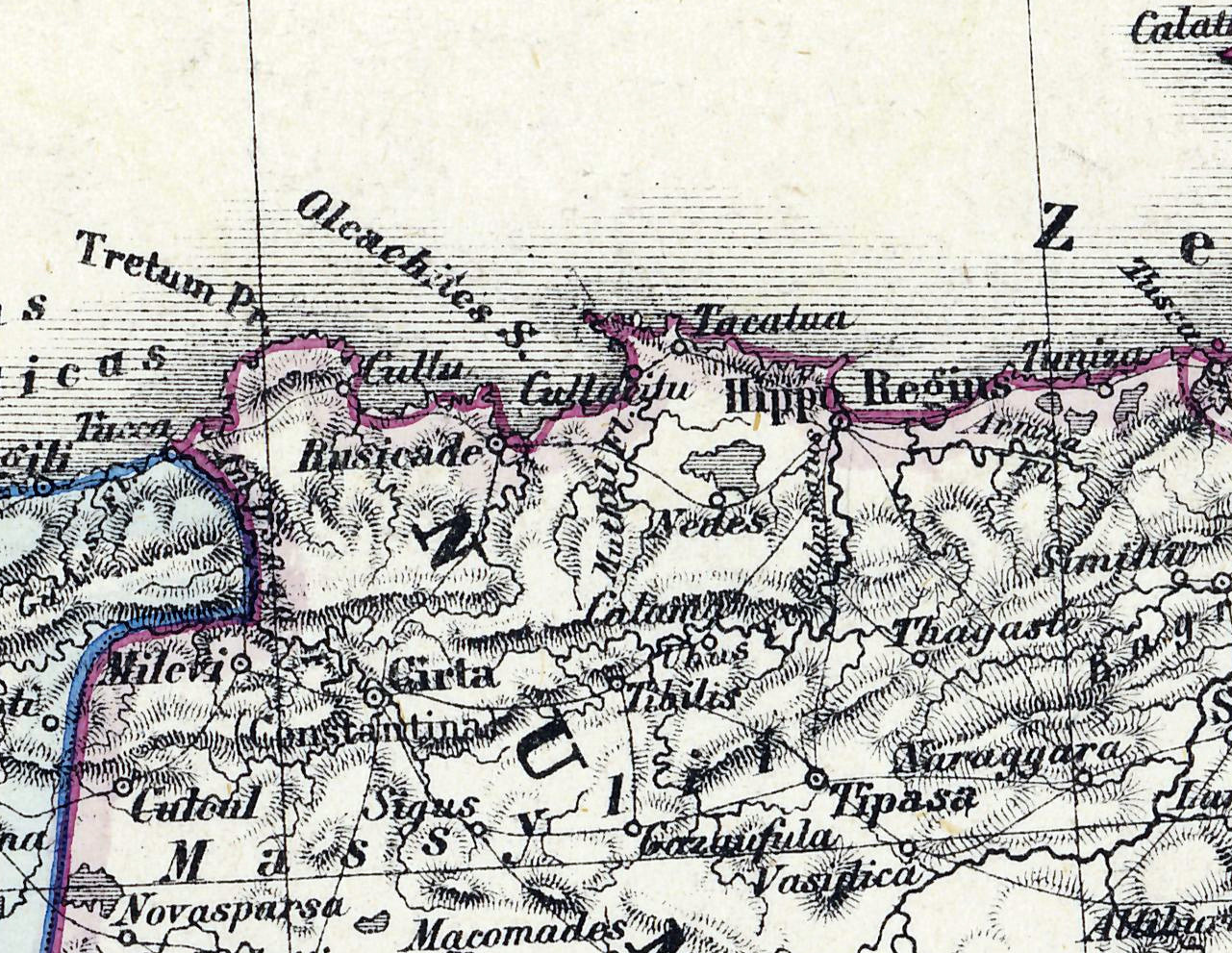
- Thagaste on the map of Numidia, just south of Hippo Regius.

- Location within Algeria
- 36°17′11″N 7°57′4″E
- Location: Algeria
- Region: Souk Ahras Province

Thagaste (or Tagaste) was a Roman-Berber city in present-day Algeria, now called Souk Ahras. The town was the birthplace of Saint Augustine.

== History ==
Thagaste was originally a small Numidian village, inhabited by a Berber tribe into which Augustine of Hippo was born in AD 354. His mother Saint Monica was a Christian and his father Patricius (with Roman roots) was at first a pagan who later adopted Christianity.

The city was located in the north-eastern highlands of Numidia. It lay around 60 miles (97 km) from Hippo Regius, (modern Annaba), 20 miles (32 km) southwest of Thubursicum (Khamissa), and about 150 miles (240 km) from Carthage (on the coast of Tunisia).

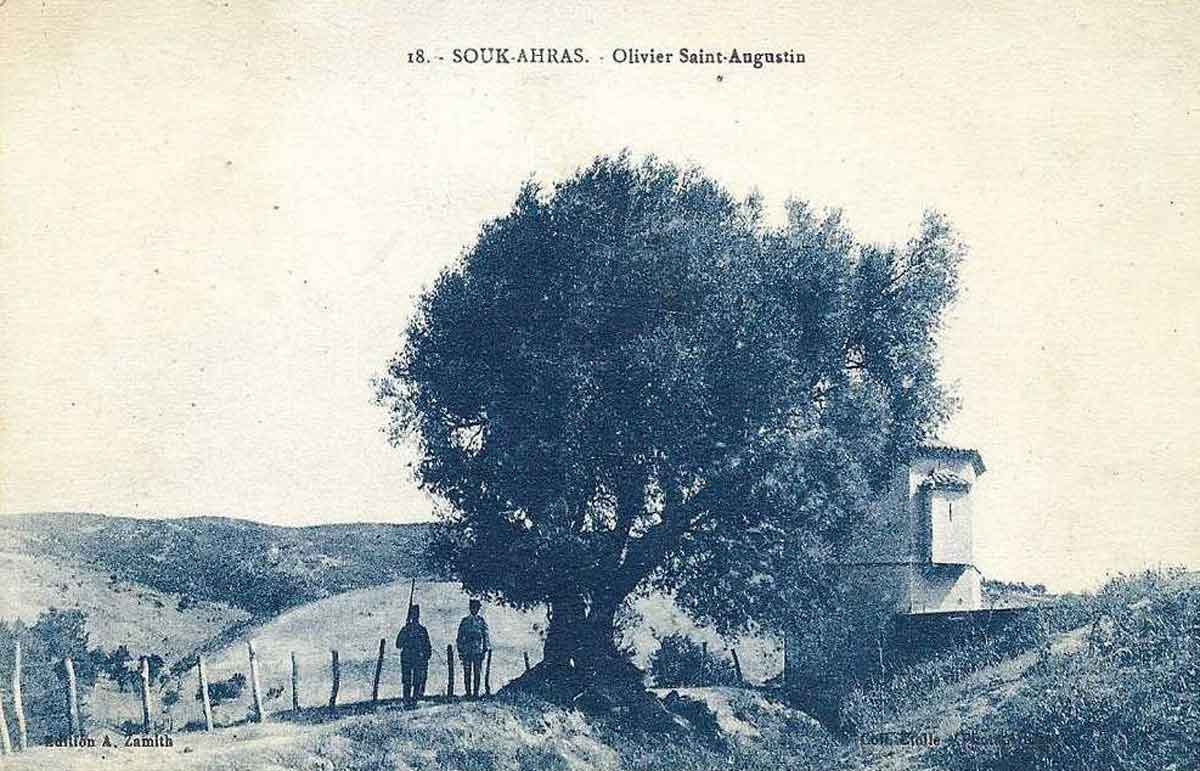
The olive tree that is believed to have been planted by Saint Augustine

Thagaste was situated in a region full of dense forest. In antiquity, this area was renowned for its mounts, which were used as a natural citadel against different foreign invaders, including the Romans, the Byzantines, the Vandals, and the Umayyads.

During the Roman period, trading increased in the city, that flourished mainly under the rule of Septimius Severus. Thagaste became a Roman municipium in the first century of Roman domination. The city was mentioned by Pliny the Elder. As a municipium, Thagaste was settled by a few Roman Italian immigrants, but was mainly inhabited by romanized native Berbers.

Indeed, Roman historian Plinius (V,4,4) wrote that Tagaste was an important Christian center in Roman Africa. It had a basilica and a Roman Catholic diocese, the latter of which was the most important in Byzantine Numidia. There are three bishops of Thagaste known to history: Saint Firminus, Saint Alypius (friend of Saint Augustine), and Saint Gennarus.

The rich and powerful gens Valeria, later under Saint Melania, owned an estate nearby which was of such extent and importance as to include two episcopal sees, one belonging to the Catholic Church, the other to the Donatists. Some of the rooms of the villa were "filled with gold".

There is a tradition that Saint Augustine used to meditate under an olive tree on a hill of Thagaste: this tree still exists and is the place of reunion even now for the followers of Augustinian spirituality.

The Byzantines fortified the city with walls. It fell to the Umayyad Caliphate toward the end of the seventh century. After centuries of neglect, French colonists rebuilt the city, which is now called Souk Ahras.

== Other data ==
Currently, philologists and researchers from the Canary Islands (Spain) have linked the Tagaste to Tegueste. The latter derives from *tegăsət, which means "humid" and is of Guanche origin, which had a Berber origin.

== Related people ==
- Saint Monica
- Augustine of Hippo, Doctor of the Church
- Martianus Capella, author
- Apuleius, author
- Alypius of Thagaste, bishop celebrated on August 15
- Firmus and Rusticus, Christian martyrs (4th century)
- Tacfarinas, resisted Roman invasions

== See also ==
- Mauretania Caesariensis
- Cuicul
- Hippo Regius
- Cirta
- Thagaste (diocese)

== Bibliography ==
- Benseddik, Nacéra. Thagaste.Souk Ahras, ville natale de saint Augustin Ed. Inas. Alger, 2005.
- Laffi, Umberto. Colonie e municipi nello Stato romano Ed. di Storia e Letteratura. Roma, 2007 ISBN 8884983509
- Mommsen, Theodore. The Provinces of the Roman Empire Section: Roman Africa. (Leipzig 1865; London 1866; London: Macmillan 1909; reprint New York 1996) Barnes & Noble. New York, 1996
- Smyth Vereker, Charles. Scenes in the Sunny South: Including the Atlas Mountains and the Oases of the Sahara in Algeria. Volume 2. Publisher Longmans, Green, and Company. University of Wisconsin. Madison,1871 ( Roman Thagaste )
