= Ulrich von Graben =

Ulrich von Graben may refer to several Austrian noblemen, including:

- Ulrich I von Graben (d. before 1325)
- Ulrich II von Graben (before 1300 – c. 1361)
- Ulrich III von Graben (1415 – 16 February 1486)
