= Ulrich II von Graben =

Ulrich II von Graben (before 1300 – c. 1361) was a Styrian noble, a member of the edelfrei Von Graben family. He held the titles as Lord of Kornberg and Graben (near Novo Mesto in Lower Carniola), as well as burgrave of Gleichenberg, Rothenfels and Hohenwang.

== Life ==
=== Origin and Family ===
He was the son of Ulrich I von Graben, burgrave of Gleichenberg, and his wife Gertrud (both died before 1325). His father had entered the service of the Lords of Walsee, a Swabian dynasty with extended properties in the Styrian lands, and from 1302 appeared as a vassal of the Stubenberg family.

Ulrich II was married with Barbara, daughter of Johann von Auersperg and Cimburgis Schauerpeck, and later with a Lady called Gertraud (died before 1375). He seemed to have left no children, as his heritage passed to his surviving brother Frederick and his nephew Frederick the Younger.

=== Coat of arms ===
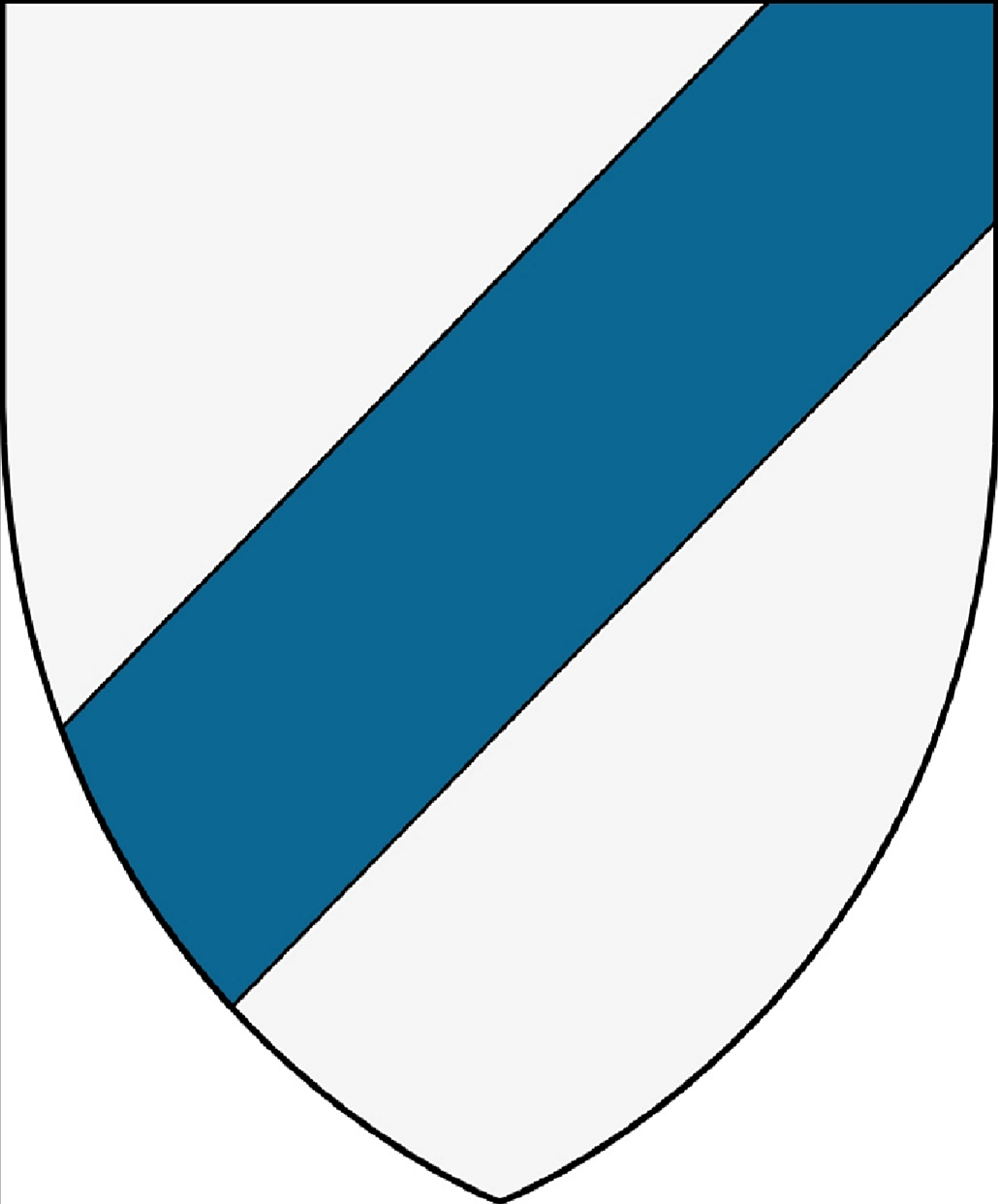
Ancient coat of arms

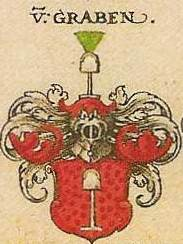
Coat of arms as Lords of Kornberg, Siebmachers Wappenbuch (1605)

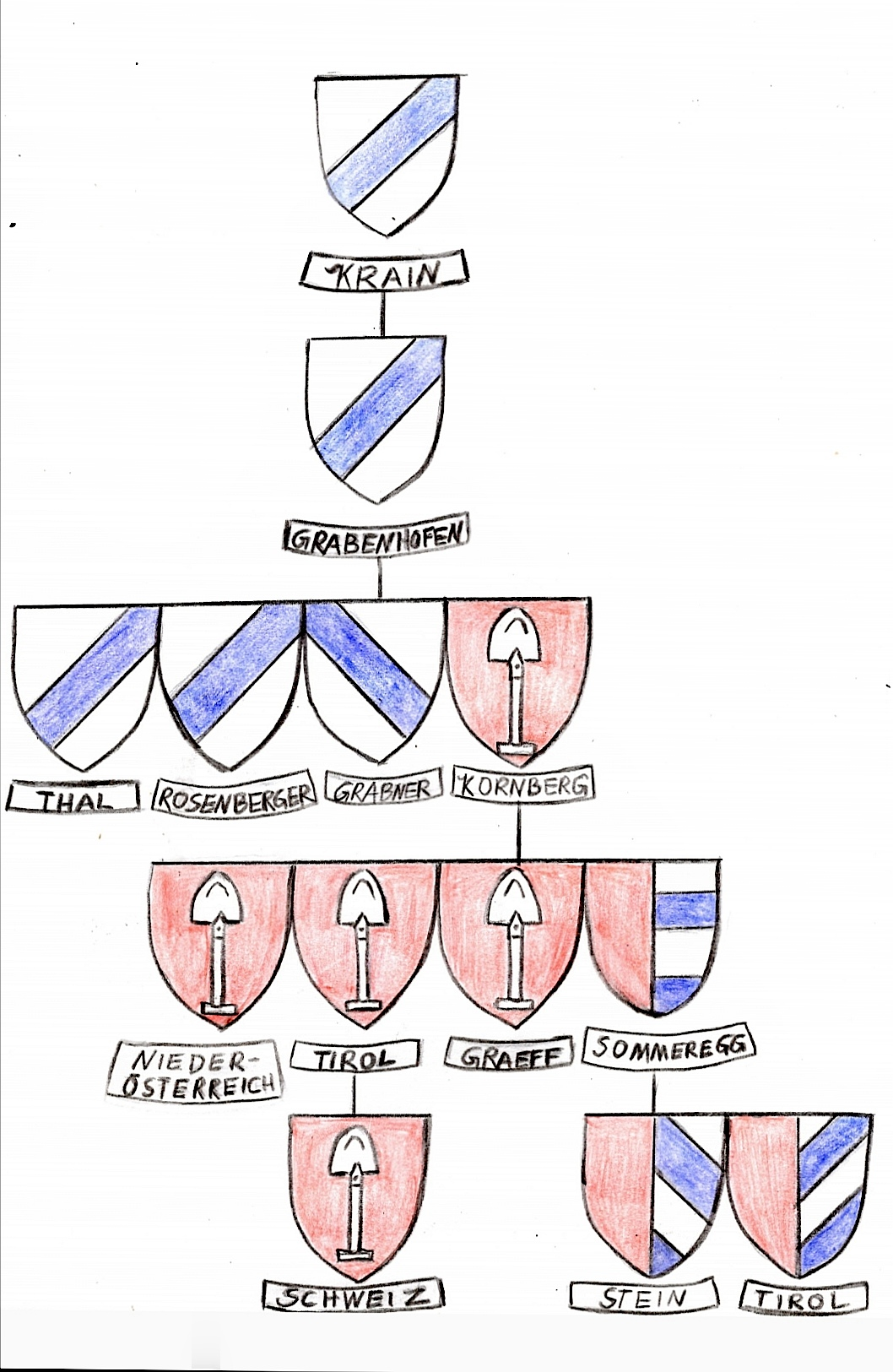
Heraldic family tree of the Graben and their descendants

The joint purchase of Kornberg by the brothers Otto I, Ulrich II and Friedrich I in 1328 from Friedrich Kornberger, together with the coat of arms and accessories resulted in the adoption of a new coat of arms, the one with the shovel, the Spade. This could explain the deviating family coat of arms of the Kornberg line of the Lords of Graben and their descents in Lower Austria, Tyrol and the Netherlands (but not in Carinthia and East Tyrol) to the family coat of arms with the diagonal bar.

- Annotation:

From his mother Gertraud von Graben (Gertraud Grabner) her coat of arms seal with the diagonal bar from the year 1331 has been preserved.

=== Career ===
Ulrich II was first mentioned in a 1300 deed, making donations to the Cistercian abbey of Rein in Styria. In 1314 he acquired the village of Wetzelsdorf. After 1325 he succeeded his father as Burgrave of In 1328, together with his brothers Otto and Frederick, he bought the Lordship (Herrschaft) and Castle of Kornberg with a new family coat of arms. The Kornberg fief remained the ancestral seat of the Styrian branch of the Graben family until the extinction of the line in 1556. Ulrich and his brothers also purchased the villages of Edelsbach and Krottendorf.

From 1343, Ulrich served as burgrave of Rothenfels, an estate then held by the Prince-Bishops of Freising. In 1354 he received the Styrian Burgraviate / Lordship and Castle of Hohenwang from the Habsburg duke Albert II of Austria in pawn.

Furthermore, Ulrich von Graben owned his family's ancient castle in Carniola, Graben Castle, near Novo mesto.

== Literature ==
- Adalbert Sikora: Die Herren vom Graben in Zeitschrift des historischen Vereines für Steiermark. 51. Jahrgang, Graz 1960
