= Herren von Graben =

Austrian noble family

- noble family
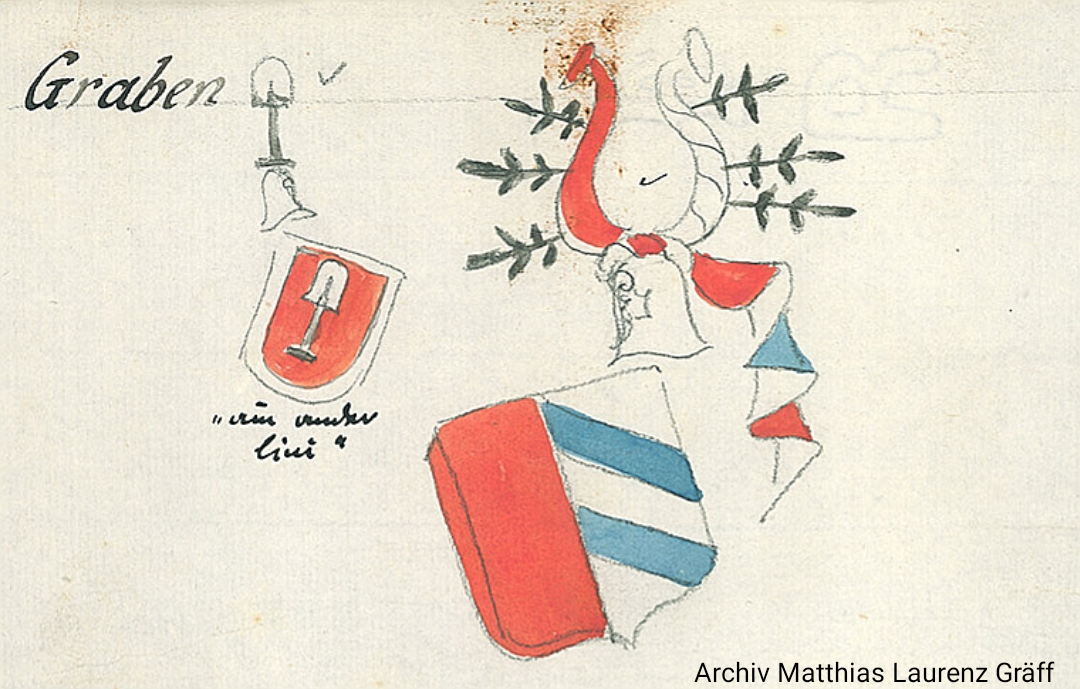
- „Daß ich grabe bürgt mein Habe.“ „Ich baue, indem ich haue.“
- Parent house: House of Meinhardin-Gorizia
- Country: Austria
- Founded: 12th century
- Founder: Konrad and Grimoald von Graben (named in 1170)
- Final ruler: Felix Jakob von Graben zum Stein († 1776/1781)
- Titles: knights
- Styles: Burgrave of Graz; Burgrave of Marburg; Burgrave of Lienz; Burgrave of Hohenwang; Burgrave of Heinfels; Burgrave and Lord of Gleichenberg; Burgrave and Lord of Sommeregg; Lord of Kornberg; Lord of Rosenburg; Lord of Pottenbrunn; Lord of Stein im Drautal; Lord of the high Lordship of Straß in Steiermark; Stadtholder of Lienz and East Tyrol etc
- Estates: Schloss Kornberg; Riegersburg Castle; Rosenburg; Burg Sommeregg
- Dissolution: 1776/1780/1781
- Cadet branches: paternal lines: Orsini-Rosenberg, De Graeff; maternal lines: Jörger von Tollet, Stadl zu Kornberg, Rain zu Sommeregg

Herren von Graben, also named von (dem) Graben, vom Graben, Grabner, Grabner zu Rosenburg, Graben zu Kornberg, Graben zu Sommeregg, Graben von (zum) Stein, and ab dem Graben was the name of an old (Uradel) Austrian noble family.

== History ==
Originally from Carniola, an apparent (or illegitimate) branch of the House of Meinhardin, the family spread in neighboring countries. The earliest known members of the Graben family, Konrad and his brother Grimoald von Graben, lived around 1170.

During the middle ages family went on to rule some Carinthian, Lower Austrian, Tyrolian, East Tyrols, Styrian, Gorizian and modern Italian districts as Burggrafen (a sort of viscount) and Herren (lords) from the early Middle Ages until the 16th-17th centuries. The last member was Felix Jakob von Graben zum Stein who lives in Tyrol († 1776 / 1781).

=== Coat of arms ===
There are three forms of representation of the gender coat of arms, Von Graben, which have their connection to one another through the established family genealogy. Originally, the family carried the coat of arms with the blue oblique beam to silver. From 1328 (until 1556/1564), the Von Graben family of the Kornberg line bore the coat of arms with the shovel (silver shovel on red). However, the derived line Von Graben zu Sommeregg (Andreas von Graben, d. 1463) adopted the oblique beam coat of arms (red, divided by blue and silver) at the time when it was converted into Ortenburger services came. A distinction is made between the family coat of arms with the blue diagonal left bar on silver (also variant with diagonal right bar), the silver shovel on red coat of arms and the coat of arms split from red, and divided three times by blue and silver (or black).

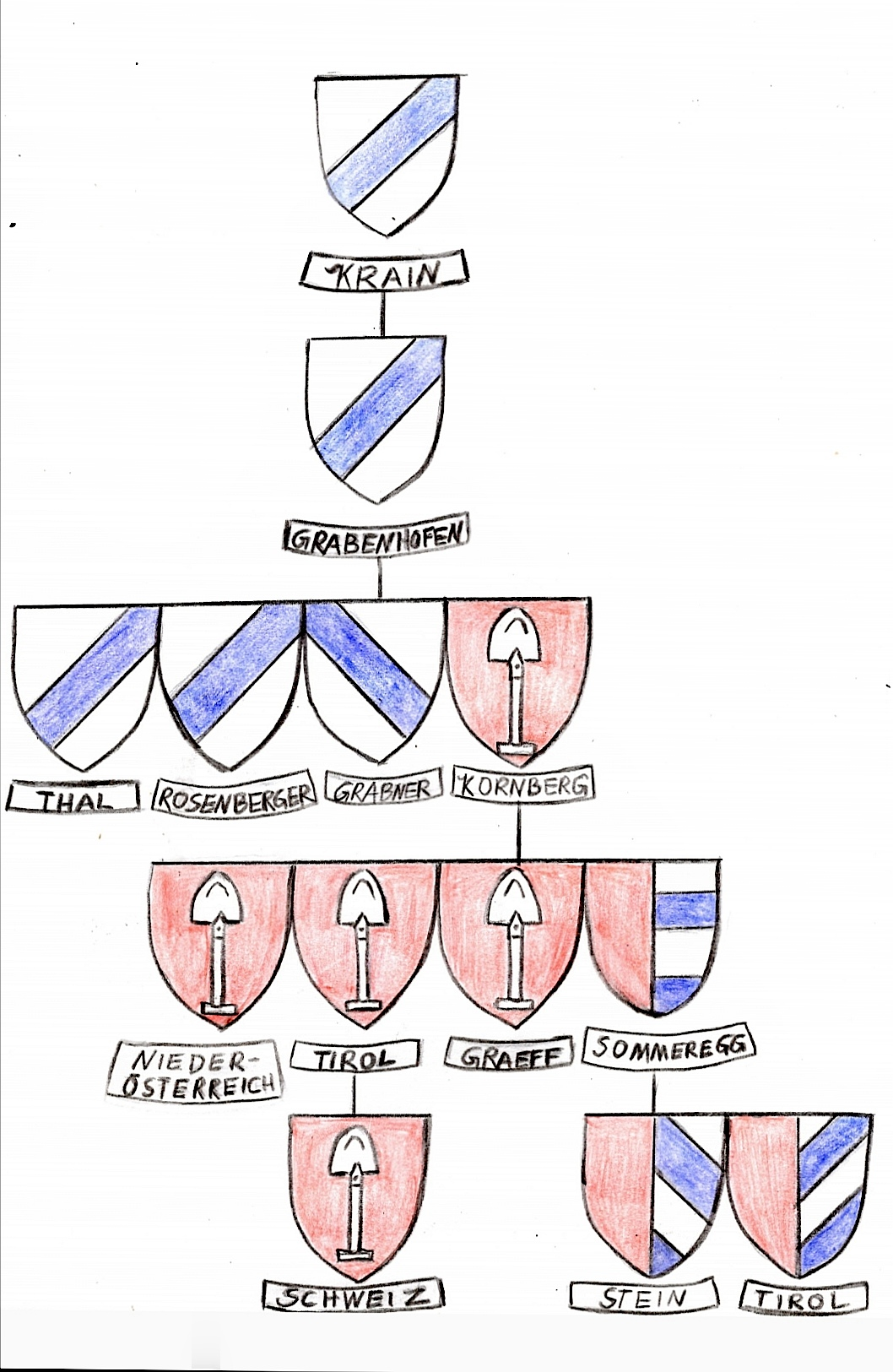
Heraldic family tree of the Graben and their descendants

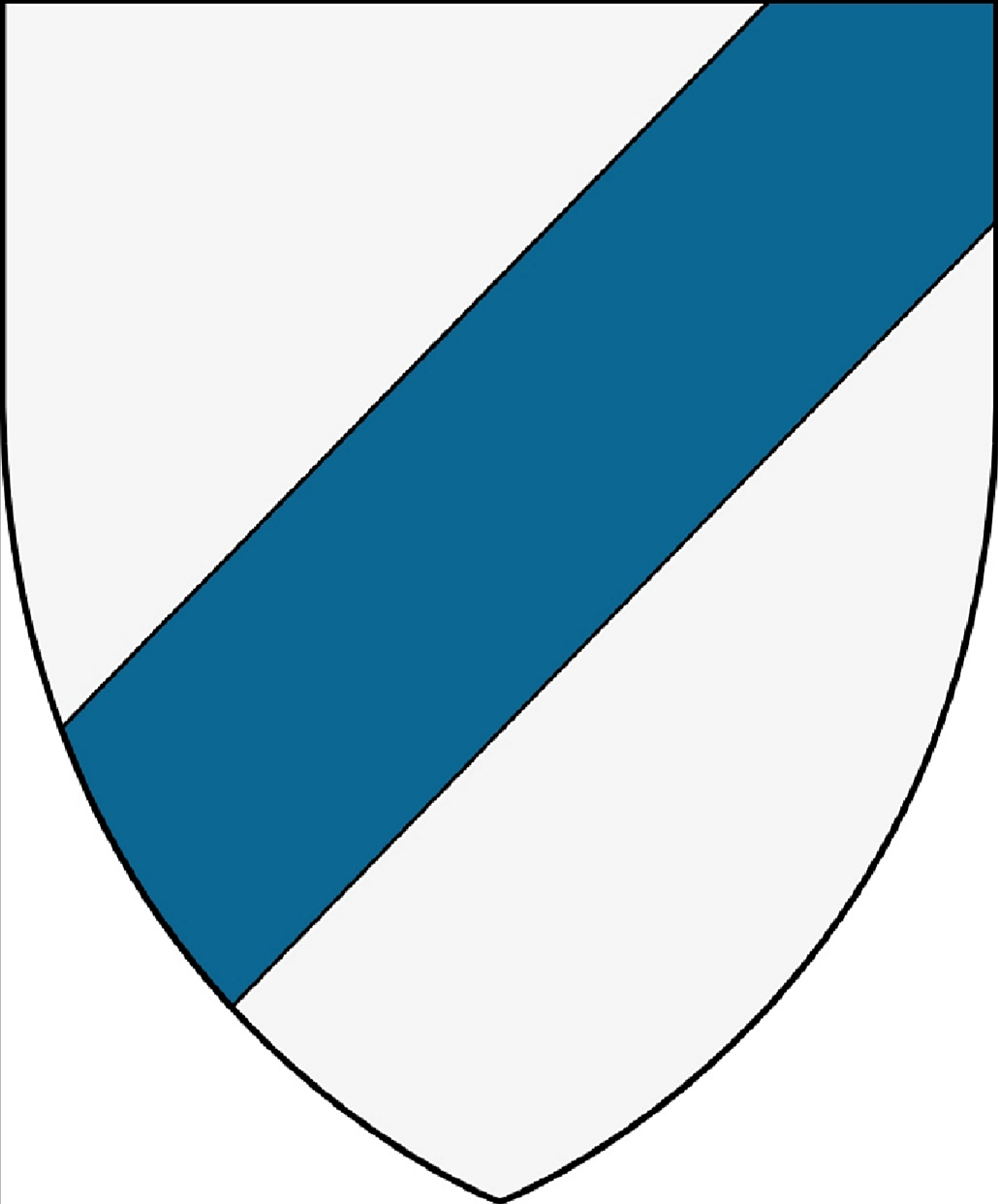
Coat of arms with blue diagonal left bar on silver (ancient)

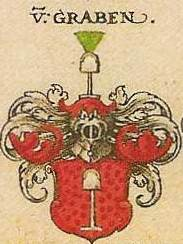
Coat of arms with silver shovel on red (variant with shovel)

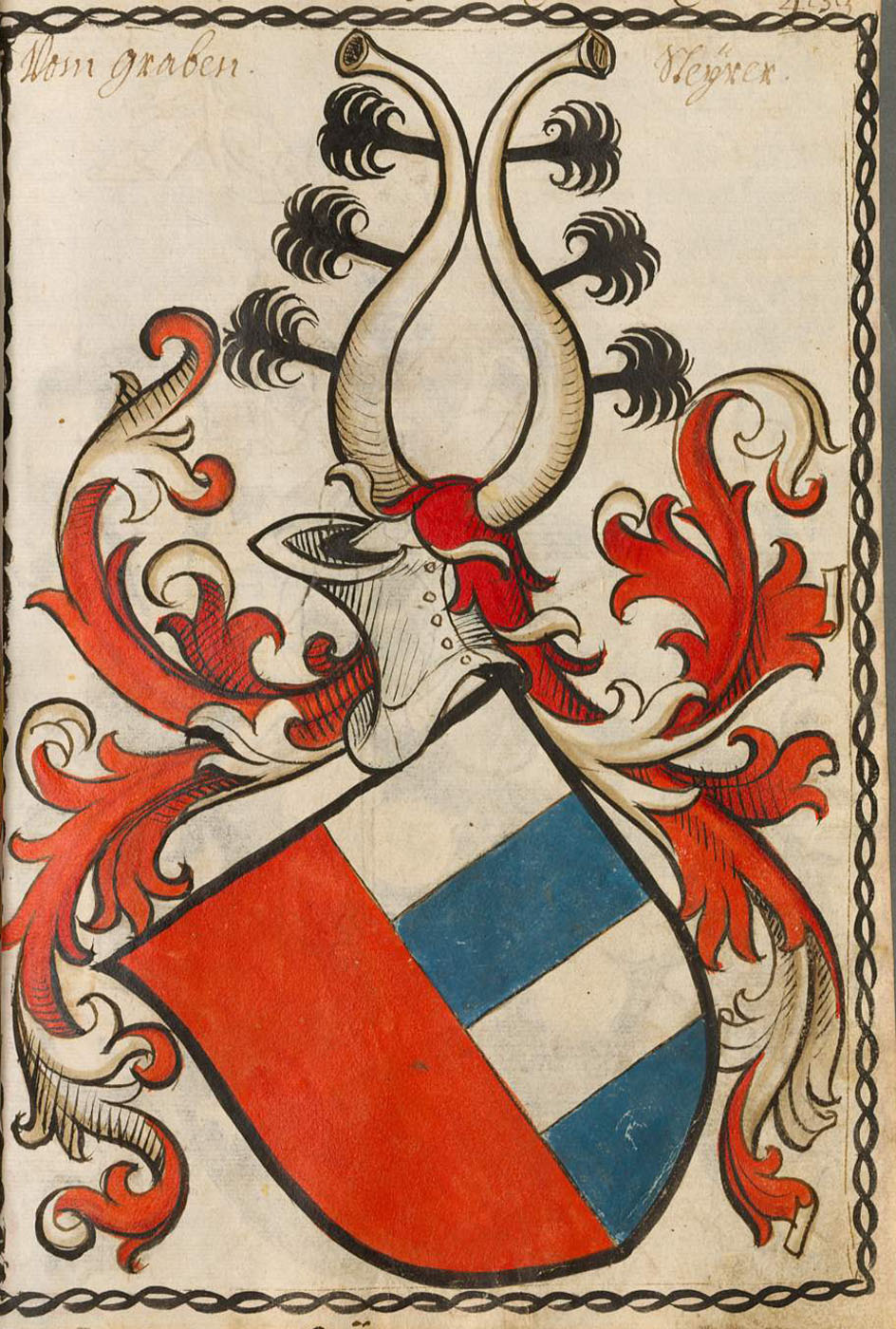
Coat of arms with split from red, blue and silver divided

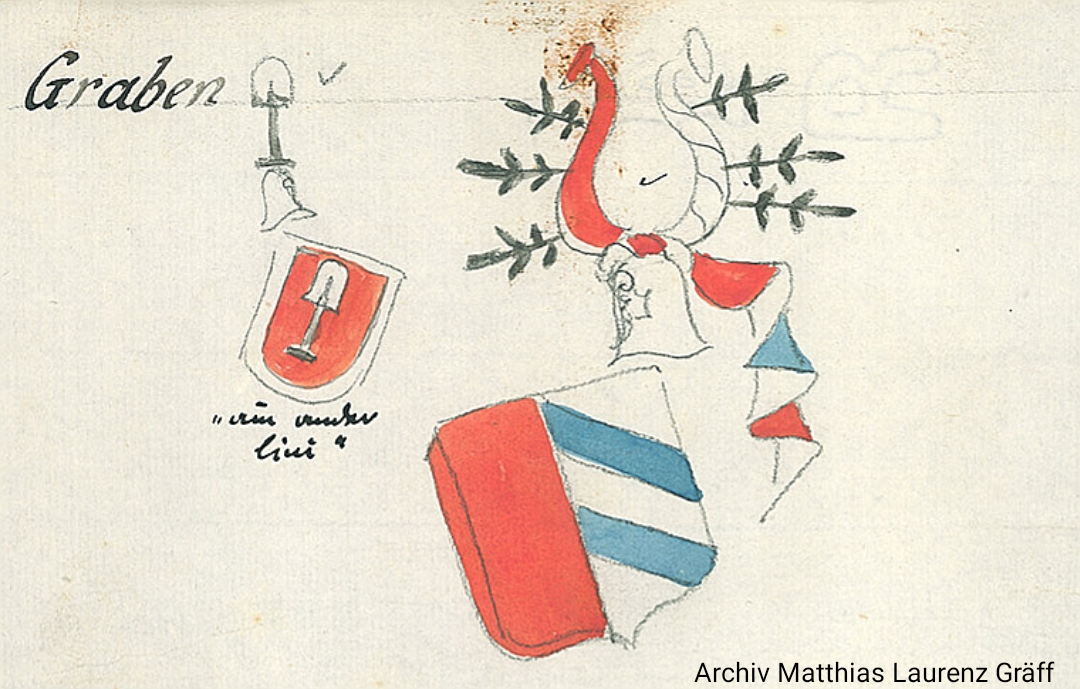
Both coat of arms versions of the Von Graben (archiv Matthias Laurenz Gräff)
1. Line am Graben (Carniola): blue diagonal left bar on silver
  1. Line am Graben, Grabenhofen (Graz, Styria): blue diagonal left bar on silver (also variant with diagonal right bar)
    1. Branch at Thal: blue diagonal left bar on silver (also variant with diagonal right bar)
    2. Rosenberger branch (later House of Orsini-RosenbergI): blue diagonal right bar on silver
    3. Line Grabner zu Rosenburg (Second line in Lower Austria): blue diagonal right bar on silver
    4. Kornberg line (Styria): silver shovel on red
      1. First line in Lower Austria: silver shovel on red
      2. First Tyrolean line: silver shovel on red
        1. Swiss line: silver shovel coat on red
      3. Family Graeff / De Graeff: silver shovel on red
      4. Sommeregg line (Carinthia): split from red, and divided three times by blue and silver
        1. Line am Stein (Carinthia): split from red, and divided three times by blue and silver
        2. Second Tyrolean line: split from red, and divided three times by blue and silver

=== The lines of the family ===
Originally from Carniola, a line settled in Styria around Graz. This line is named "Line Am Graben". During the later 13th century the later princely family Orsini-Rosenberg descended from a member of the family who lived at the Grazer Castle Alt-Grabenhofen, between Reinerkogel and Rosenberg. During the early 14th century, the family split into four main lines, the Styrian Grabenhofen line, the Grabner (zu Rosenburg) line in Lower Austria, the Kornberg line and their Dutch offspring (De) Graeff, and according to another unverfivied family tradition the Op den Graeff family as well, and during the earlier 15th century in the Carynthian-Lienzer Sommeregg line. In 1500, the family split into a new line, the Stein Line at Castle Stein. Two other lines of the Graben family can be found in Tyrol, and one in Switzerland. A detailed list of the lines and branches can be found here:

1. Counts of Gorizia, Meinhardin
  1. Line Am Graben (Carniola), before 1170-13th century
    1. Line Am Graben, Grabenhofen (Graz, Styria), before 1259-1468
      1. Branch at Thal, early 14th century-after 1341
      2. Rosenberger branch (later House of Orsini-RosenbergI), after 1322
      3. Line Grabner zu Rosenburg (Second line in Lower Austria), before 1314-mid 17th century
      4. Kornberg line (Styria), before 1325-1564
        1. First line in Lower Austria, 1324-1421
        2. First Tyrolean line, 2nd half 15th century-after 1519
          1. Swiss line, unknown
        3. Graeff / De Graeff family (The Netherlands), around 1484
        4. Sommeregg line (Carinthia), before 1436-early 17th century
          1. Line am Stein (Carinthia), 1500-1664 in male line
          2. Second Tyrolean line, early 16th century-1776/80

==== Kornberg line ====
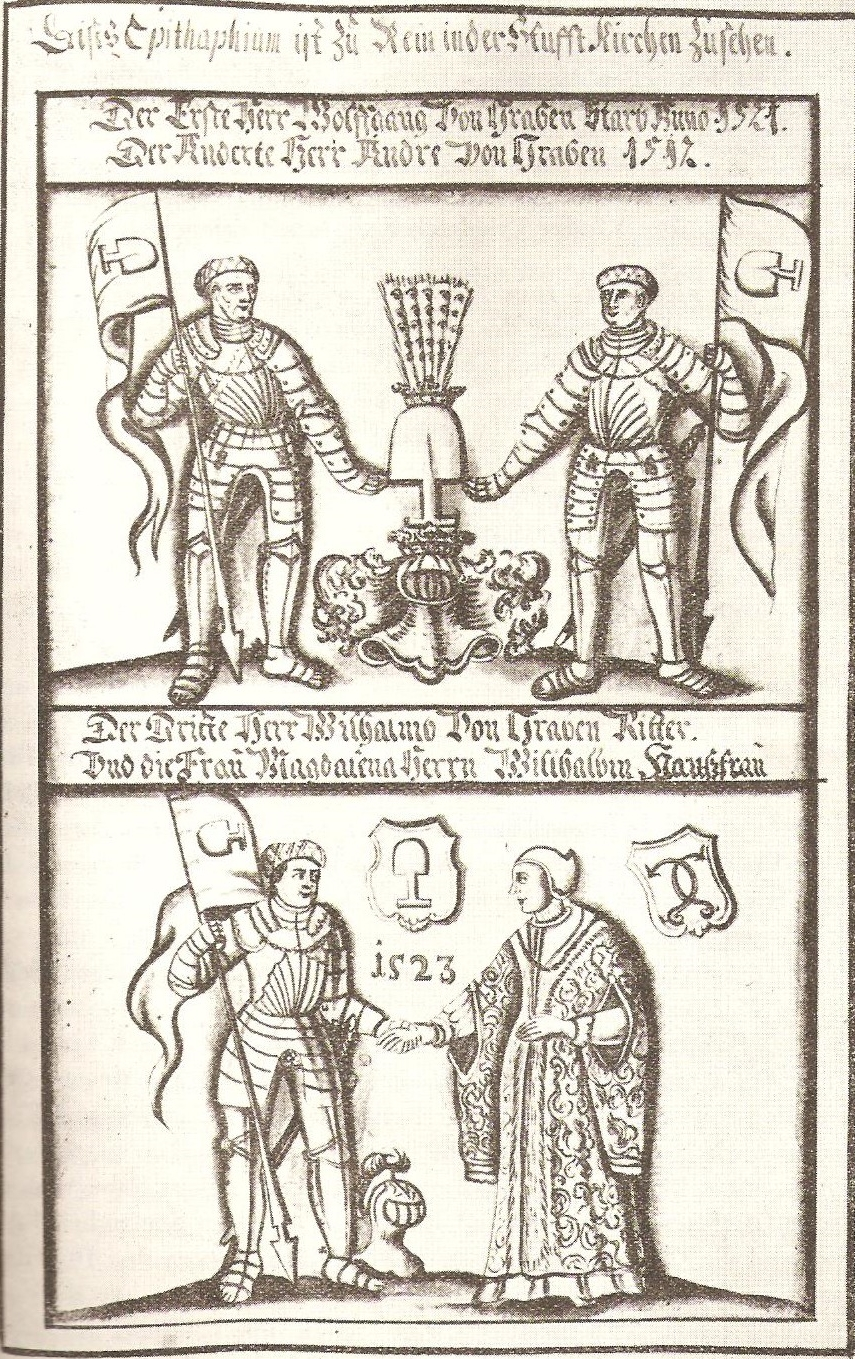
The brothers Wolfgang, Andree and Wilhelm von Graben with his wife Magdalena von Stubenberg

The Grabner zu Kornberg came from Styria in Graz and belonged to the same tribe as the Grabner zu Rosenburg. The first important member of the family was Ulrich II von Graben (named between 1300–1361), who was elevated to the Styrian title of Burggraf of Hohenwang. The Styrian line's residence between 1328 and 1556 was at Schloss Kornberg. Between 1456 and 1564, the Kornberg line was owned the important Lordship Marburg with Obermarburg and the Marburg Castle. They were linked by marriage with the Lords of Windisch-Graetz, Auersperg, Stubenberg, and Guttenberg. The Dutch family De Graeff claimed descent from Wolfgang von Graben, a member of the Graben family. Andries de Graeff and his son Cornelis became Free Imperial knights of the Holy Roman Empire. That diploma dates from 19 July 1677:

Fide digis itegur genealogistarum Amsteldamensium edocti testimoniis te Andream de Graeff [Andries de Graeff] non paternum solum ex pervetusta in Comitatu nostro Tyrolensi von Graben dicta familia originem ducere, qua olim per quendam ex ascendentibus tuis ejus nominis in Belgium traducta et in Petrum de Graeff [Pieter Graeff], abavum, Johannem [Jan Pietersz Graeff], proavum, Theodorum [Dirck Jansz Graeff], avum, ac tandem Jacobum [Jacob Dircksz de Graeff], patrem tuum, viros in civitate, Amstelodamensi continua serie consulatum scabinatus senatorii ordinis dignitabitus conspicuos et in publicum bene semper meritos propagata nobiliter et cum splendore inter suos se semper gessaerit interque alios honores praerogativasque nobilibus eo locorum proprias liberum venandi jus in Hollandia, Frisiaque occidentale ac Ultrajectina provinciis habuerit semper et exercuerit.

The Kornberg line died out in 1664 with the death of Anna von Graben. The Lords of Stadl were heirs to their extensive Estate. The inheritance included the possessions of Marburg / Maribor, Kornberg, Rohrbach an der Lafnitz, Grabenhofen with Alt-Grabenhofen Castle, Liechtenberg and Krottenhofen.

===== Members =====
- Ulrich I von Graben († before 1325)
- Ulrich II von Graben († around 1361)
- Friedrich I von Graben († before 1404)
- Friedrich II von Graben (* before or around 1379; † before 1463)
- Ulrich III von Graben (1415-1486)
- Reinprecht V von Graben (named between 1456 and 1493)
- Wolfgang von Graben († 1521)
- Andree von Graben († 1521)
- Wilhelm von Graben († 1523)
- Andrä von Graben († 1556)
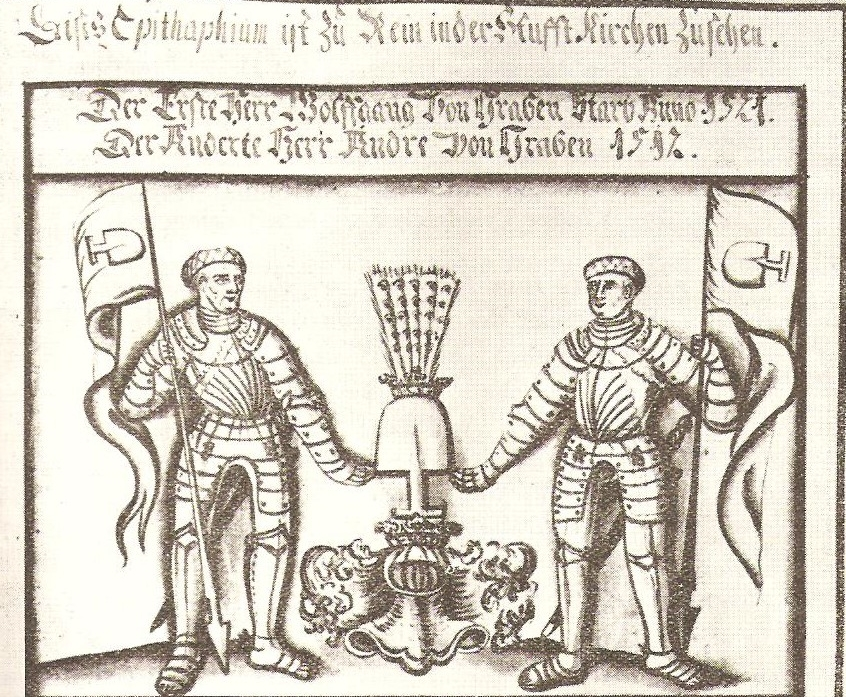
Wolfgang von Graben († 1521) and his younger brother Andree von Graben († 1521), Lords of Kornberg and Maribor, Burgraves of Saldenhofen

==== Line Grabner zu Rosenburg ====
The Grabner zu Rosenburg came from Styria in Graz and belonged to the same tribe as the Kornberger Graben. They had extensive property with the Rosenburg and Pottenbrunn as well as in Moravia and was one of the advocates of Protestantism during the Reformation in Lower Austria. In the 16th century the Grabner Rosenburg made a center of the Austrian Reformation history. During the 16th and early 17th centuries, the Grabner were among the richest and most respected families in Austria, and one of the country's dominant Protestant noble families.

===== Members =====
- Sebastian I Grabner zu Rosenburg († 1535), leading protestant
- Georg Grabner zu Rosenburg und Zagging (* before or around 1510; † 1562), protestant forerunner
- Leopold Grabner zu Rosenburg (1528–1583), leading protestant
- Sebastian II Grabner zu Rosenburg († 1610), leading protestant
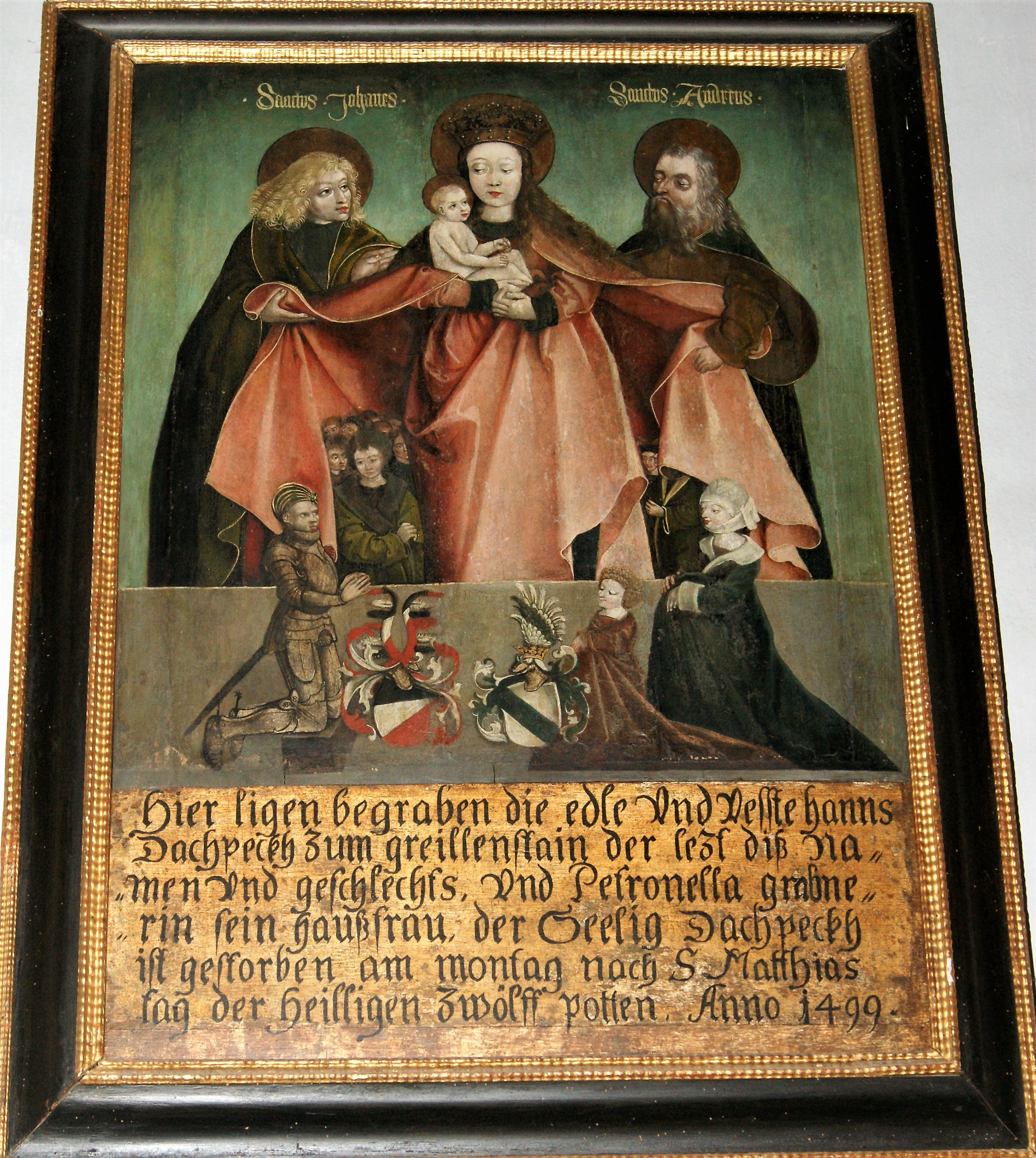
Epitaph of Hans von Dachpeck zu Greillensteina († 1499) and his wife Petronelle Grabner zu Judenau

==== Sommeregg line ====
The Sommeregg line which came from the Kornberg line, was the most important family at the court of the Meinhardins of Gorizia in the late 15th and early 16th centuries. The family was mentioned from Vom Graben instead of Von Graben only in Upper Carinthia and East Tyrol. During the later Middle Ages, the success of that family arose from the steady accumulation of land, and loyalty to the Counts of Görz and later to the Habsburg Emperor. The line resided in Lienz, East Tyrol and Carinthia, and became "the most prominent of the family". Family members held the noble titles as the Burgraves of Sommeregg, Heinfels and Lienz. After the death of Leonhard of Gorizia in 1500, they became his successors as stadtholders of Lienz and East Tyrol. The Lienzer line died out in the year 1534, and the zum Stein in 1664.

They were linked by marriage with the Lords of Auersperg, Saurau and Breuner.

===== Members =====
- Andreas von Graben (Vom Graben; † 1463)
- Cosmas von Graben (Vom Graben; 15th century)
- Virgil von Graben (Vom Graben; 1430/1440-1507)
- Rosina von Graben von Rain († 1534)
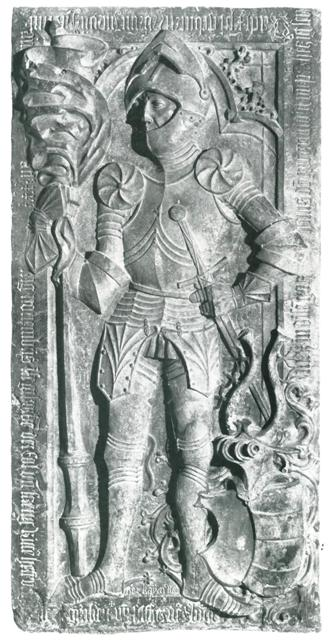
Virgil von Graben (1430/40-1507)

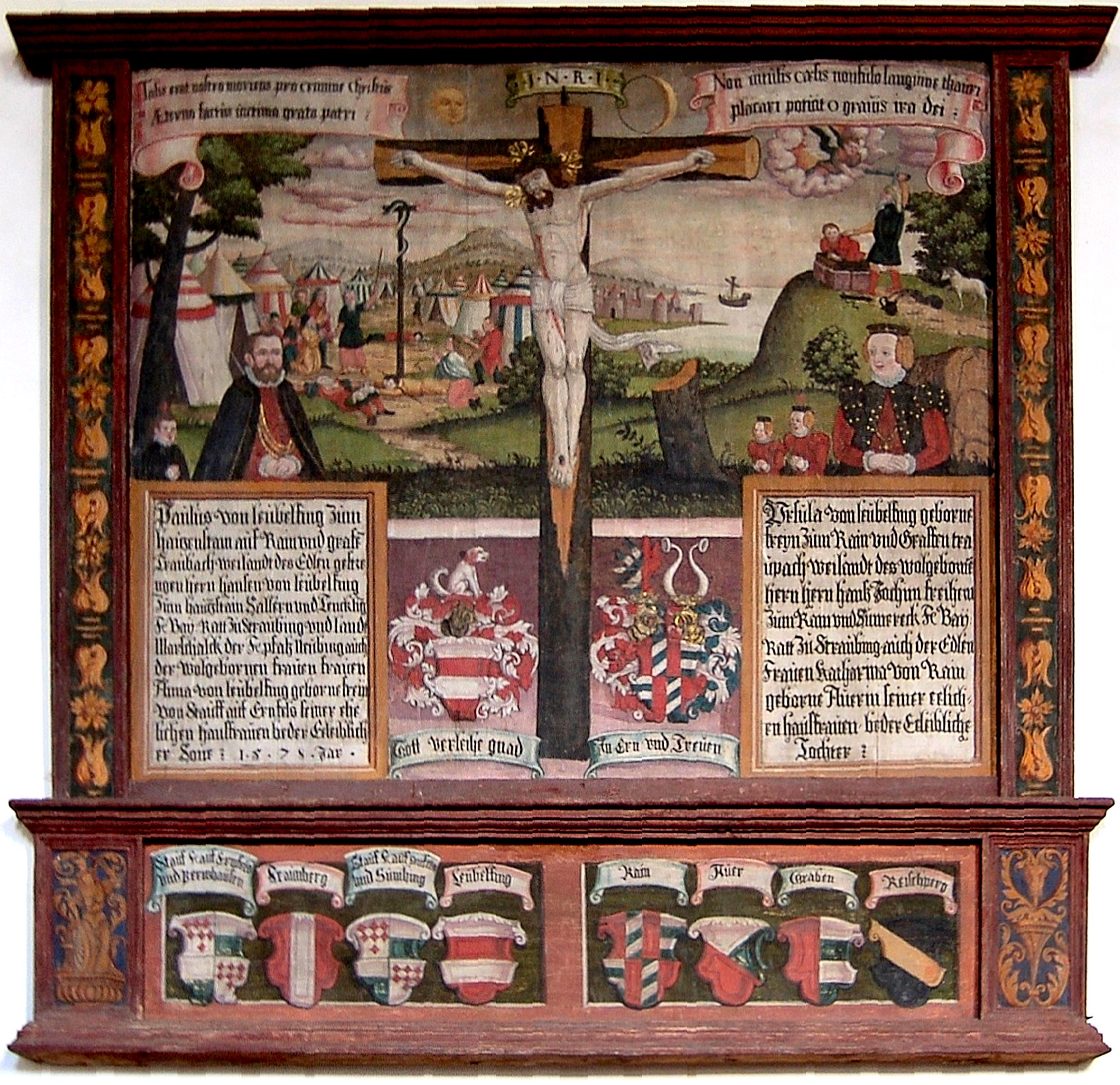
Coat of arms Graben zu Sommeregg-Von Rain zu Sommeregg

==== Line at Stein ====
The line at Stein came from Carinthia and East Tyrol and sprang out of the Sommeregg line. The family was mentioned from Vom Graben instead of Von Graben only in Upper Carinthia and East Tyrol. The family held the title Lord of Stein.

- Lukas von Graben zum Stein (15th-1550)

==== Tyrolian line ====
The Tyrolian line came from Carinthia and East Tyrol and sprang out of the Sommeregg line.

- Otto von Graben zum Stein, was named "Graf zum Stein" (1690–1756)
- Felix Jakob von Graben zum Stein († 1776/1781), official; last heir of the Von Graben family
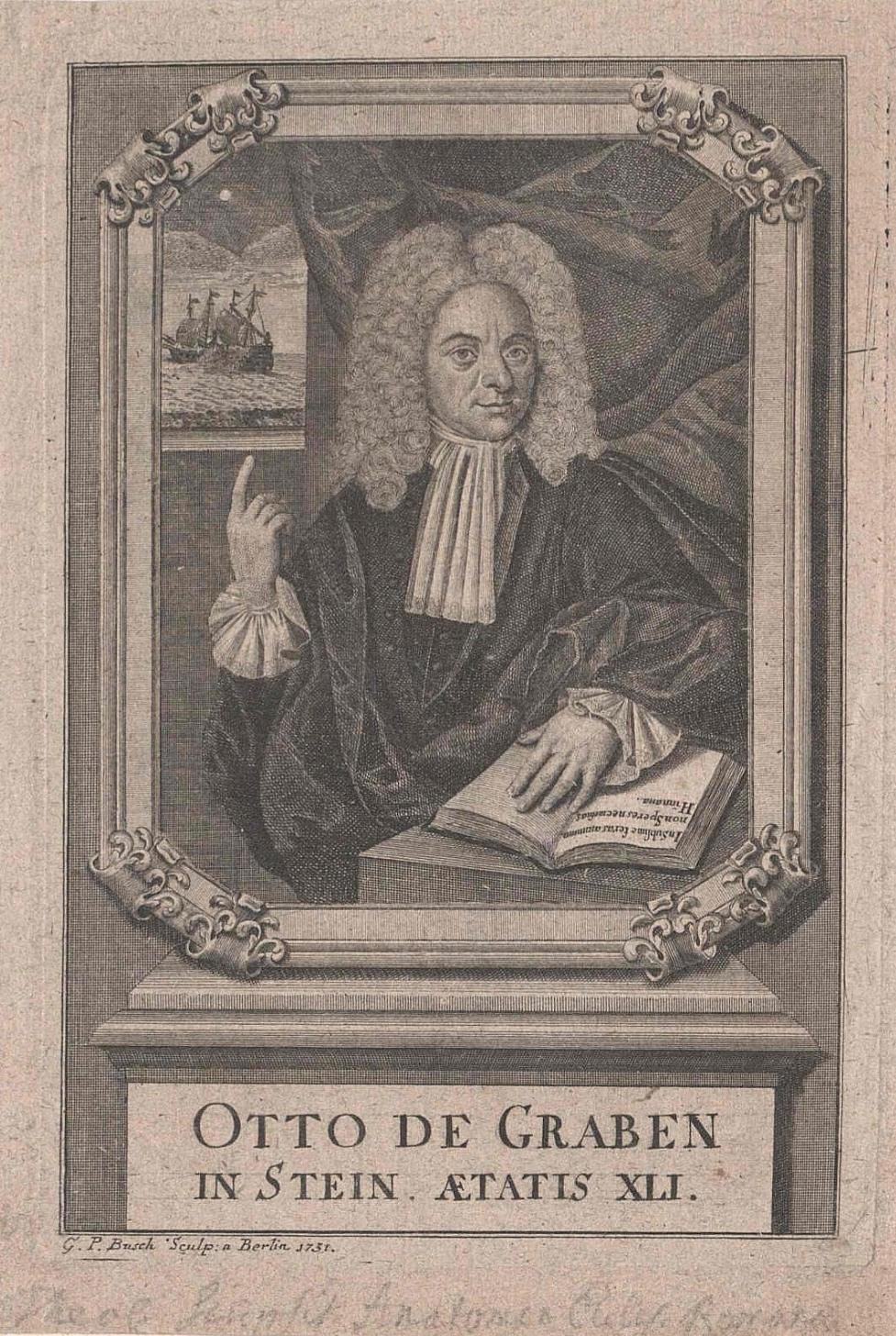
Otto von Graben zum Stein (1690-1756)

=== Feudal ===
==== Burgraviates ====
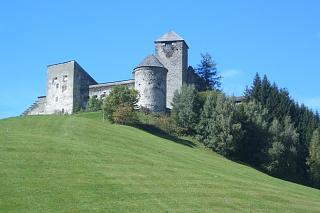
Heinfels Castle

- Burgrave of Lienz
- Burgrave and Lord of the manor Heinfels
- Burgrave and Lord of the manor Hohenwang
- Burgrave and Lord of the manor Sommeregg
- Burgrave and Lord of the manor Lengberg
- Burgrave and Lord of the manor Saldenhofen
- Burgrave and Lord of the manor Gleichenberg
- Burgrave and Lord of the manor Riegersburg
- Burgrave and Lord of the manor Landskron

==== High Lordships ====
- High Lordship and Castle of Straß
- High Lordship of Marburg an der Drau and Castle of Obermarburg

==== Lordships ====
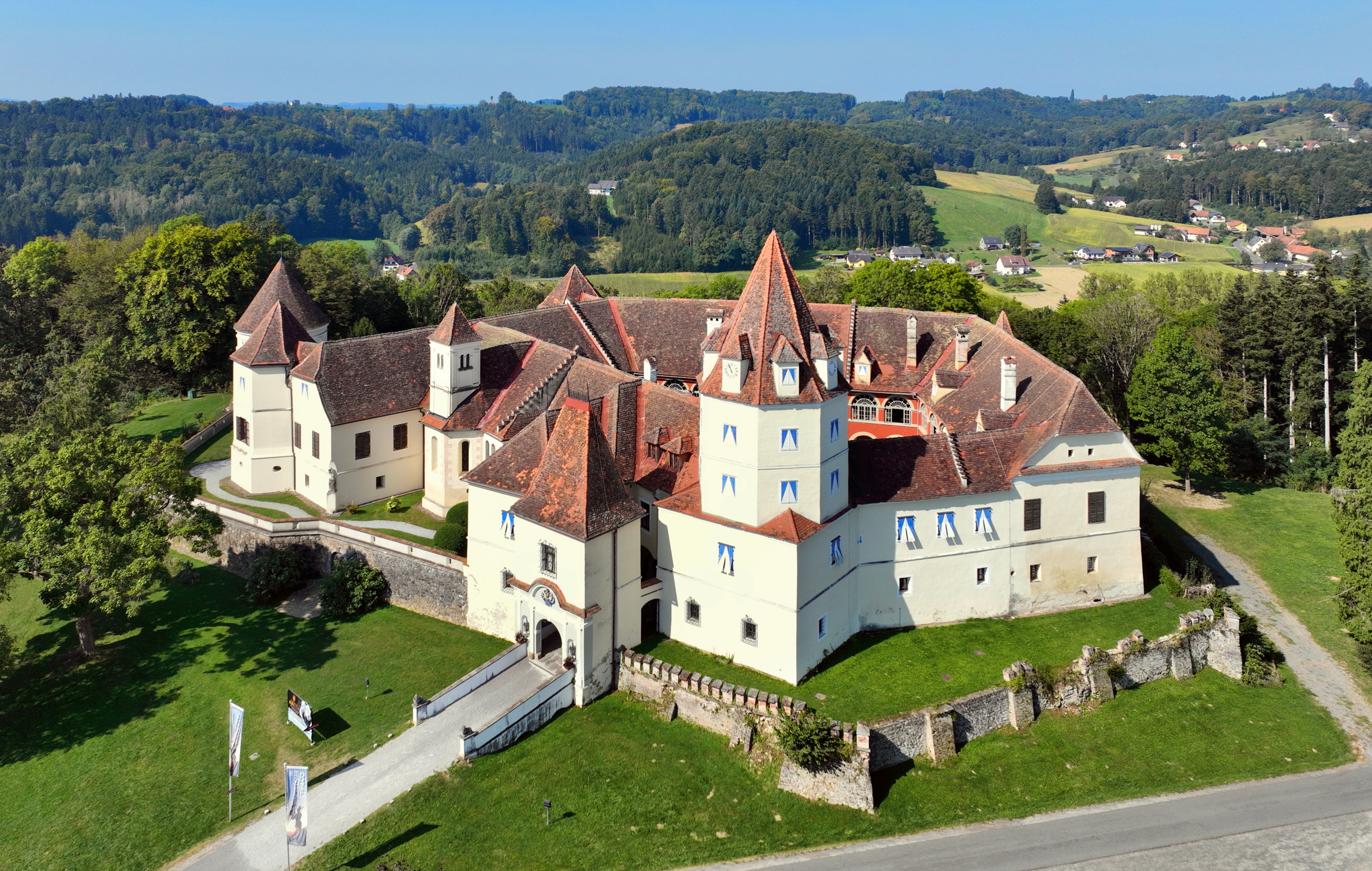
Schloss Kornberg

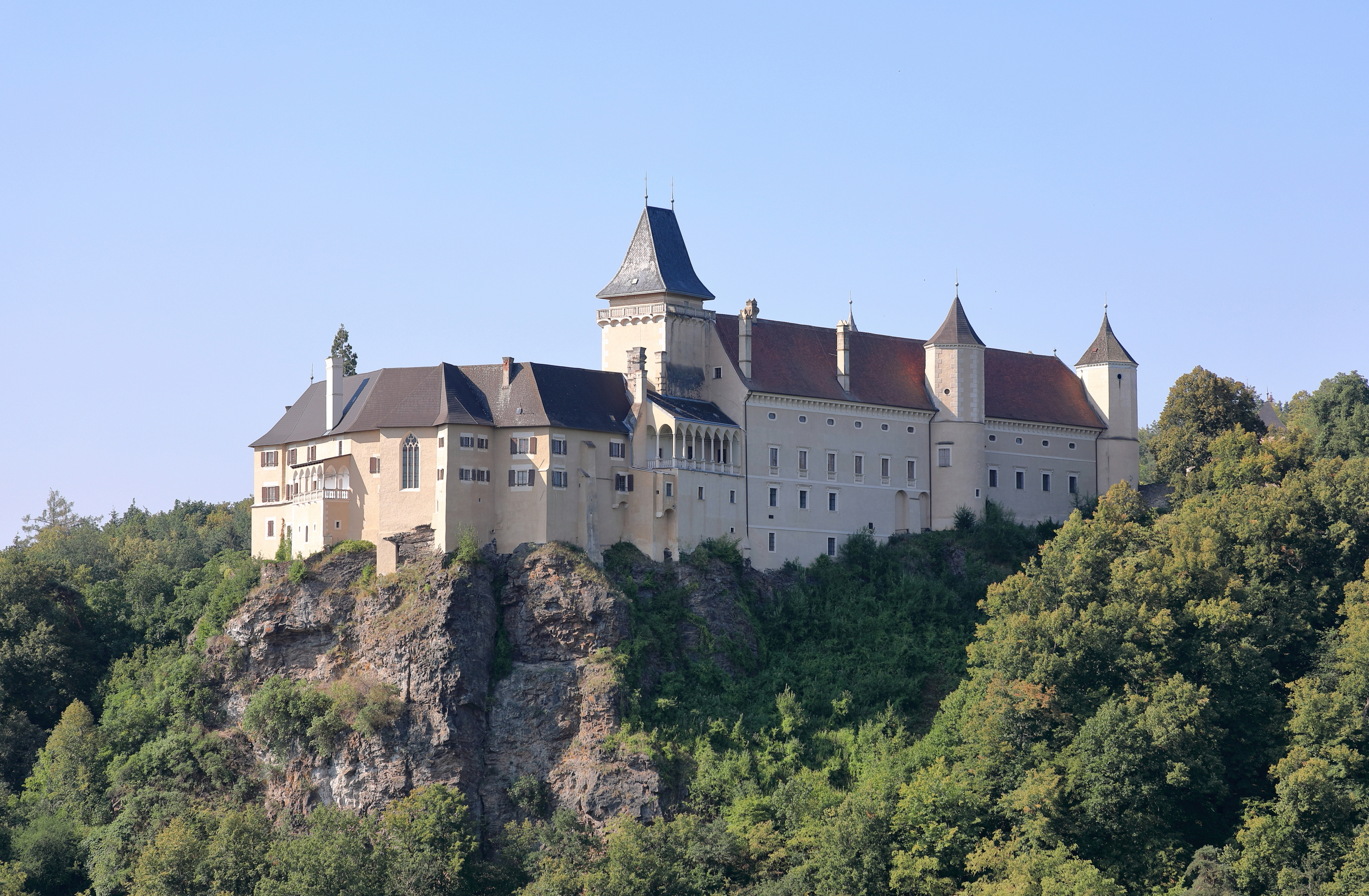
Schloss Rosenburg

- Lordship and Castle of Kornberg
- Lordship and Castle of Rosenburg
- Lordship and Castle of Pottenbrunn
- Lordship and Castle of Zagging

==== Lord of the manor ====
- Lord of the manor Graben near Rudolfswerth (Novo Mesto)
- Lord of the manor Schloss Alt-Grabenhofen in the north of Graz
- Lord of the manor Stein Castle (Carinthia)| Stein
- Lord of the manor Herbstenburg
- Lord of the manor Weidenburg
- Lord of the manor Eppenstein

==== Castles, residences ====
- Ansitz Graben at Lienz
- Burg Bruck at Lienz

== Varia ==
In 2013 the worldwide Family Association Gräff-Graeff (Familienverband Gräff-Graeff e.V.) was founded for the claimed Graeff lineage of Wolfgang von Graben.

== See also ==
- Von Graben family tree
