= Ulrich III von Graben =

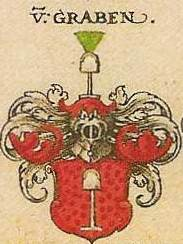
Coat of arms of the Styrian Von Graben dynasty, Siebmachers Wappenbuch (1605)

Ulrich III von Graben (1415 – 16 February 1486) was a member of the Austrian nobility, Lord of Kornberg, (Ober)Radkersburg, Grabenhofen, Graben and the Lordship Marburg, Obermarburg and Maribor Castle.

He was an important member of the court of Frederick III, Holy Roman Emperor, considered as an unswervingly loyal supporter of the Emperor and fulfilled for him various high political and responsible functions in the Duchy of Styria, such as that of imperial Burggraf of Graz and Marburg (Maribor) and Landeshauptmann of Styria.

== Biography ==
=== Origin and offspring ===
Ulrich's parents were Friedrich II von Graben and a Lady von Plankenwarth or Adelheid Hoffer. He was a descendant of the House of Graben von Stein, originating from the dynasty Meinhardiner. He was related to the Lords Philipp Breuner and Ruprecht I von Windischgraetz. His uncle was Lord Andreas von Graben zu Sommeregg, the founder of the Carinthian line of the family.

The genealogist Gabriel Bucelin entitled Ulrich von Graben in his work Germania topo-chrono-stemmato-graphica sacra et prophana as a baron. However, no elevation of Grabens to the (free)Lord is known.

In 1464 Ulrich von Graben married Agnes Närringer, daughter of Mert Närringer and widow of lord Hans Breuner. The couple had seven children.

- Wolfgang von Graben († 1521), Lord of Graben, Kornberg, Marburg enz. Burggraf of Saldenhofen, imperial military and administrator
- Andree von Graben († 1521), Lord of Kornberg, Marburg and Graben, Burggraf of Saldenhofen, bailiff of Slovenj Gradec (Windischgraetz)
- Georg von Graben († 1522)
- Rosina von Graben († 1539), married Heinrich from the House of Guttenberg, princebishop-bambergs stadholder in carynthia
- Margret (Marusch) von Graben, married three times; Andree von Himmelberg, Christoph von Silberberg and with the bavarian Siegmund von Königsfeld(er), Lord of Niederaichbach (1500; † 1539). Note about Von Himmelberg: Hans von Himmelberg fought against the peasants in Salzburg in 1525 and died in 1550 after campaigning against the Turks. In the Lavanttal, the Himmelbergers owned Himmelau Castle, Neudau, the adjoining Schleinzhof and the Pauric House in Wolfsberg.
- Elisabeth von Graben, married Lord Georg IV von Auersperg
- Wilhelm von Graben († 1523), Lord of Kornberg, Marburg and Graben, Lord of the manor and Burggraf of Saldenhofen and imperial Burggraf of Burg Neuberg

=== Political career ===
Ulrich was first named in 1452 as member at the Coronation of the Holy Roman Emperor of Frederick III of Austria. In 1456, in a dispute with Wolfgang von Walsee, Ulrich and his father Frederick II were awarded the important Lordship Marburg, including Obermarburg, the district of Marburg an der Drau and Marburg Castle.

==== Burgrave and captain of Marburg, Landeshauptmann of Styria ====
Also in 1456, Ulrich was elected imperial Burggraf (burgrave) of Maribor. In 1462 he succeeded Lord Eberhard VIII von Walsee as Landeshauptmann (state captain / governor) of the Duchy of Styria. In 1469 Ulrich was enfeoffed as imperial steward with Marburg Castle, which his father had obtained in the trial against the Lords of Walsee. In the same year, during the Baumkircherfehde, Andreas Baumkircher, Hans von Stubenberg, Andreas von Greisenegg and Niklas von Liechtenstein brought the feud to the governor Ulrich von Graben instead of to the Emperor himself. In 1469 he was succeeded as Landeshauptmann by Count Wilhelm von Dirnstein. In the same year Ulrich became imperial Seneschal and emperor Friedrich III pledged him with the castle of Maribor.

In 1474 he was one of the councilors appointed by the emperor from the duchies of Styria, Carniola and Carinthia, who had the task of drawing up resolutions against the Turkish threat and then informing the prelates, the nobility and the cities of these duchies about them. Up until 1482, Von Graben was mentioned in various documents as the imperial burggraf of Maribor

==== Burgrave and captain of Graz, governor of Styria ====
Since Ulrich von Graben excelled in his Marburg post, Emperor Friedrich appointed him commander of the main palace in Graz in 1480, imperial burggraf of Graz and the palace captain (castellan) of the Graz palace (whereby, according to other sources was first introduced to this office in 1481 or even in 1483). In this time he was the emperors deputy. As such, he was appointed by the Emperor to be the protector of his daughter Kunigunde of Austria, who was staying in Styria, and whose safety was threatened by the Hungarian incursions under Matthias Corvinus. At the end of 1481, Ulrich von Graben, as imperial captain in Graz, received notifications and an imperial order from Vienna about a suspected political attack by some people from the hereditary nobility. Here he was able to thwart a robbery conspiracy and a related kidnapping of the Habsburg archduchess.

When the Emperor left Styria (for good) in 1484, he appointed five "lawyers" (governors) he trusted: in addition to Burgrave Ulrich von Graben, these were Bishop Matthias Scheit of Seckau, Friedrich von Stubenberg, the administrator of the Styrian provincial government Christoph von Mindorf and the imperial secretary Andreas am Stein.

The Emperor owed him the captain's pay and Burghut for Marburg and Graz for years. Ulrich's last documented mention was in 1486.
