= Friedrich II von Graben =

Styrian noble

Frederick II von Graben (born before or around 1379; died before 1463), also called Frederick the Younger (German: Friedrich der Jüngere), was a Styrian noble, a member of the edelfrei Von Graben family. He held the titles as Lord of Kornberg and Marburg, the Lordship Marburg as well as burgrave of Riegersburg. One of the most affluent Styrian nobles, Frederick was an advisor to the Habsburg emperor Frederick III, where he held a special position, assessor at the Reichskammergericht, and member of the duchy's Landtag assembly.

== Life ==
=== Family background ===
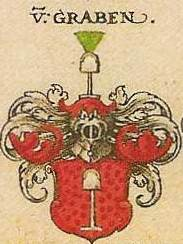
Coat of arms of the Styrian Von Graben dynasty, Siebmachers Wappenbuch (1605)

Frederick's ancestors were of the Kornberg branch (Styria) of the Von Graben family. His parents were Frederick I von Graben (died c. 1422 at Kornberg Castle), progenitor of the Kornberg line, and Katharina von Sumerau or Saurau. Frederick II later succeeded his father in Styria, while his brother Andreas von Graben (d. 1463) inherited the Carinthian (Ortenburg) estates of his wife. In 1438 he married Elisabeth Steinwald von Fladnitz with whom he had four children One of them, Ulrich III von Graben (d. 1486), a loyal follower of Emperor Frederick III, was appointed Landeshauptmann of the Styrian duchy.

Frederick was also in close contact with the Konradin family line at Alt-Grabenhofen Castle near Graz; so sealed Reinprecht III vom Graben contracts from Frederick I and Frederick II, a marriage certificate from Katrey von Graben, a sister (?) of Frederick and Niclas von Roggendorf, and in 1399 in a deed of sale from the two Fredericks to the Bishop of Freising, Berthold von Wehingen. The interesting thing here is that all the seals are still in good condition and the two Friedrichs show the newer coat of arms with the upright spade, but Reinprecht shows the old Graben family coat of arms with the diagonal bar.

=== Career ===
Frederick II von Graben first appeared in 1399 in a deed. In 1401 he received the burgraviate of Riegersburg serving the Walsee noble dynasty from Swabia. He soon acquired further estates from Seckau Abbey and, since 1443, owned the villages of Neudorf and Pölan as well as parts of the villages Altendorf near Wolfsberg in Carinthia and Wanofezen. Frederick was a councilor of Emperor Friedrich III, where he held a special position. From 1446 he is documented as a member of the Styrian estates (Landstände) and appointed by the Emperor as master of chambers for his cousin (arch)duke Siegmund of Austria-Tyrol. In 1456 received, together with his son Ulrich III von Graben, the pawned the Lordship Marburg with Obermarburg and Maribor Castle from the Walsee owners. Frederick von Graben showed his attachment to the roots of his family in Carniola by appearing in 1461 as one of the founders and signatories, in which Ljubljana was elevated to the Roman Catholic Diocese of Ljubljana.
