= Ulrich I von Graben =

Ulrich I von (vom) Graben (d. before 1325) was a burgrave and knight from the Austrian Herren von Graben family

== Biography ==
Nothing is known about Ulrich's parents, but it can be assumed that he was a younger son of the Konradin line at Graben of the Lords of Graben (in and around Graz). Konrad I, Rennewart and Walther vom Graben can be seen as his (older) brothers. Three of Ulrich's sons from his marriage with Gertrud, Otto I, Ulrich II and Frederik I became ancestors of the Kornberg line of the family.

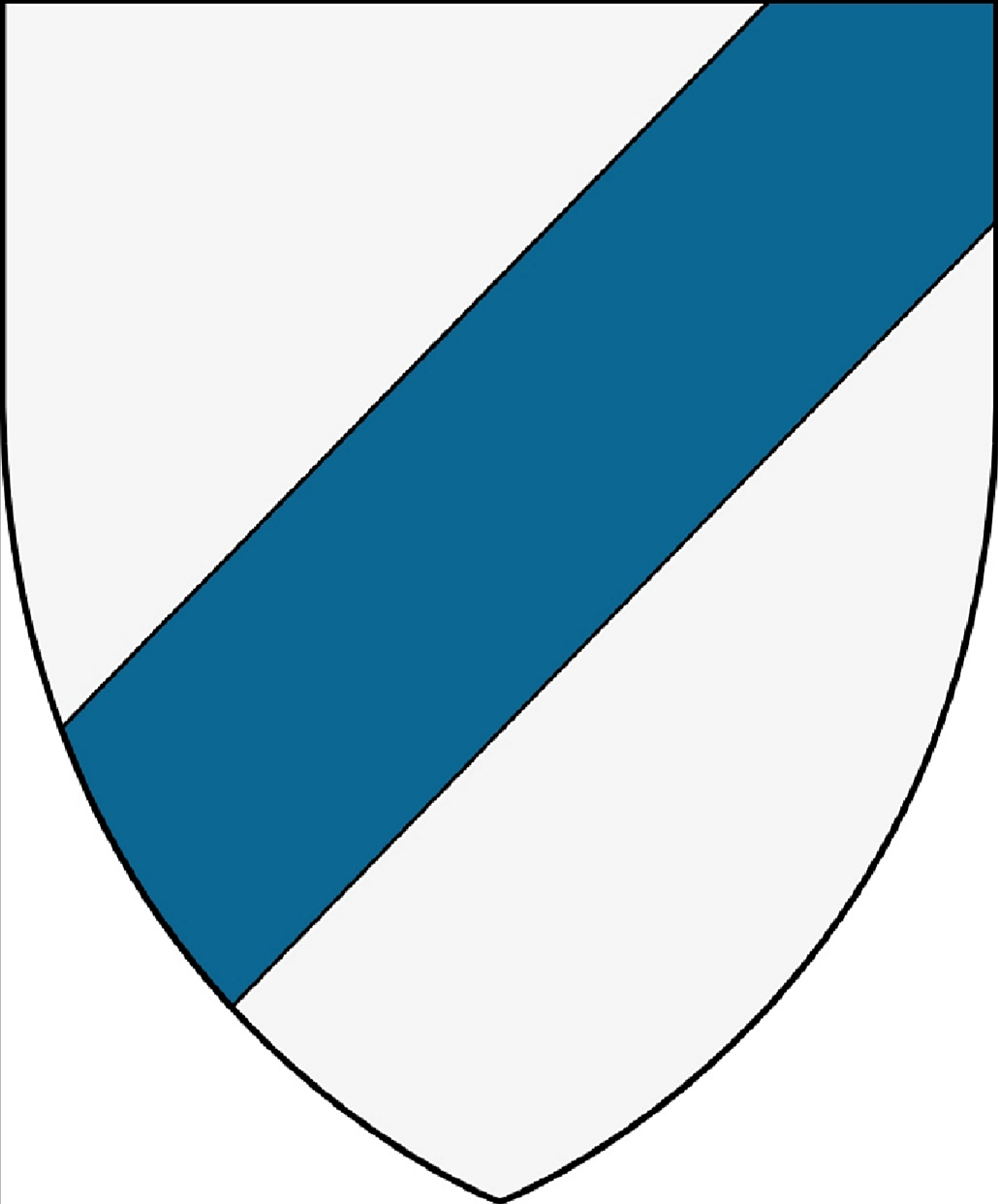
Coat of arms of Graben (a blue diagonal left bar on silver

Ulrich had no parental inheritance, joined like the Konradin line in the service of the powerful lords of Walsee and quickly made a large fortune there. He and his descendants also had close ties to the Rein abbey of the Konradin line. He first appeared in 1302 as a feudal lord of the Stubenberg family (as the Konradin line did) when he received the village of Greindorf, south of Graz, as a fief from them. Ulrich was also the first burgrave of Gleichenberg, who held this office between 1302 and 1324 and probably also oversaw the construction of the castle. He also called himself Ulzo von Gleichenberg. His sons Otto, Ulrich and Frederick were also burgraves of Gleichenberg.
