= Wolfgang von Graben =

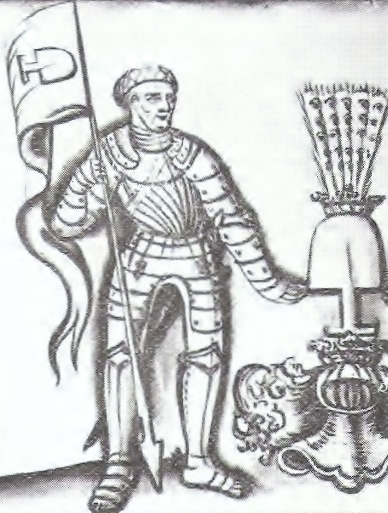
Wolfgang von Graben in a contemporary representation (15th/16th century)

Wolfgang von Graben, also Wolfgang de Groben (de Gröben) and Wolfgang Grabenski (died 11 December 1521) was born in Kornberg castle, Styria and a member of the Austrian nobility. He held the titles as a Lord of Graben, Kornberg, the Lordship Marburg with Obermarburg and Maribor Castle, Radkersburg, Neudenstein, Weinberg and Burggrave (Viscount) of Saldenhofen.

Together with his son Peter, he went to Holland in the entourage of Archduke Maximilian I of Austria, where his son became the progenitor of the dutch (De) Graeff family. Later, Wolfgang von Graben also acted as a major captain of Holy Roman Emperor Friedrich III of Austria and as an advisor to Holy Roman Emperor Maximilian I of Austria.

== Biography ==
=== Origin ===
Wolfgang was a descendant of the Herren von Graben family, who descend from the Meinhardiner dynasty. He belonged to the Styrian line on Kornberg, which had descended from the Konradin line am Graben around and at Graz at 1314. This line owned the larger lordships of Kornberg and Marburg, Obermarburg (Maribor) among a lot of smaller fiefs in the Duchy of Styria. His parents were Ulrich III von Graben and Agnes Närringer. Ulrich III Was imperial Governor of Styria, burgrave of Graz and Marburg, senior official and councilor of the Holy Roman Emperor Friedrich III of Austria. He had two older brothers in Andree and Wilhelm, both his successor as Lords of Kornberg and Marburg and a cousin in Virgil von Graben, high official, governator of the County of Gorizia, as well as imperial governor and advisor of the Holy Roman Emperors Frederik III and Maximilian I. Wolfgang von Graben was first named in 1470 as heritage Jörg II Steinwalds of some manors of 30 styrian Stubenberg fiefs.

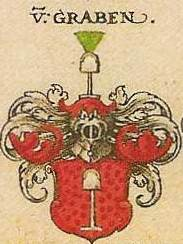
Coat of arms of the Styrian Von Graben zu Kornberg line, Siebmachers Wappenbuch (1605)

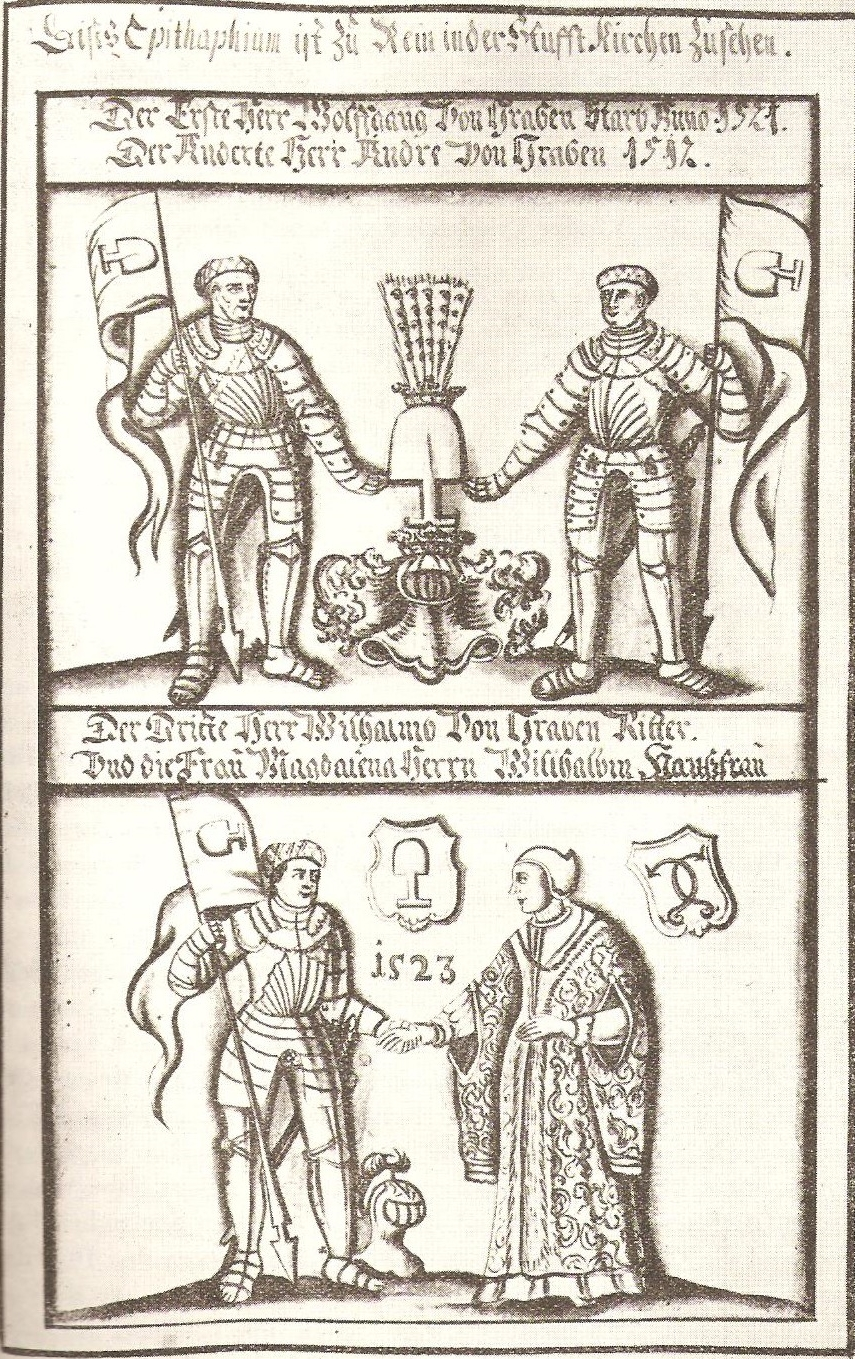
The brothers Wolfgang, Andree and Wilhelm von Graben with his wife Magdalena von Stubenberg

=== In Holland, family Graeff ===
In 1476, Wolfgang von Graben and his son Peter von Graben (born 1450s or early 1460s) went to Holland in the entourage of Archduke Maximilian of Austria [the later Emperor]. The latter had just acquired Holland by marrying Mary of Burgundy. Margarethe von Croppenstein is reported as Peter's mother, but this cannot be correct, since she is mentioned as the wife of a Wolfgang von Graben, but only in the 16th century, which therefore applies to a later Wolfgang von Graben. Wolfgang entered the military service and was assigned to the archduke. Peter married Griet Pietersdr Berents from the "Berents-De Grebber family", took the name Pieter (de) Graeff (or De Graaff) and became the ancestor of the Dutch Graeff/De Graeff family. Wolfgang was also mentioned in Holland in 1483.

According to another family tradition Wolfgang had another son, Abraham op den Graeff (around 1484-1561), from a marriage in Holland. This claim isn't proofed by any reliable external source. In the Diploma of Nobility from 19 July 1677 loaned to Andries de Graeff, it was affirmed that the family De Graeff was formerly called Von Graben, which is the same as De Graeff, because Graeff was the Dutch spelling of the german word Graben during the 14th and 15th century. This family today shows the same coat of arms as the De Graeff family.

=== Later life ===
Returning to Austria around 1485, Wolfgang von Graben became one of the Holy Roman Emperor Friedrichs III major captains in the war against Matthias Corvinus. In 1489 Von Graben succeeded his father as lord of Marburg, castle Obermarburg and the citypalace Marburg an der Drau. In the following year he succeeded his cousin Georg Breuner as lord of some smaller styrian and imperial fiefs. In the same year he became lord of castle Neidenstein.

In 1494, Wolfgang and his two brothers Wilhelm and Andree negotiated with the Roman-German King Maximilian I about the estimated value of their share in the Glauning forest (municipality of Sankt Peter am Ottersbach), including villages, farmers and two ponds. In return, they came into possession of the lordship and the castle of Saldenhofen (today's Vuzenica in Slovenia). In 1498 Wolfgang was named imperial burggraf of Saldenhofen. Later he became bailiff of Bad Radkersburg and since 1501 of Tabor. In 1500 he bought Weinburg Castle from the Emperor Maximilian in exchange for a loan. He held this office until 1509, when the imperial iffice and Saldenhofen Castle changed administrators. In 1509 he was made advisor to Emperor Maximilian. In 1510 he succeeded his brother Andree von Graben as bailiff of Slovenj Gradec (Windischgraetz). The same year Wolfgang von Graben was given ownership of the Radkersburg office for three years.

In 1520 Wolfgang von Graben inherited together with his brothers Andree and Wjlhelm von Graben Schloss Graben (Graben castle) near Novo Mesto (Rudolfswerth) in Carniola. Wolfgang von Graben is buried in the family grave in the collegiate church in Rein.

Castles and residences of Wolfgang von Graben:

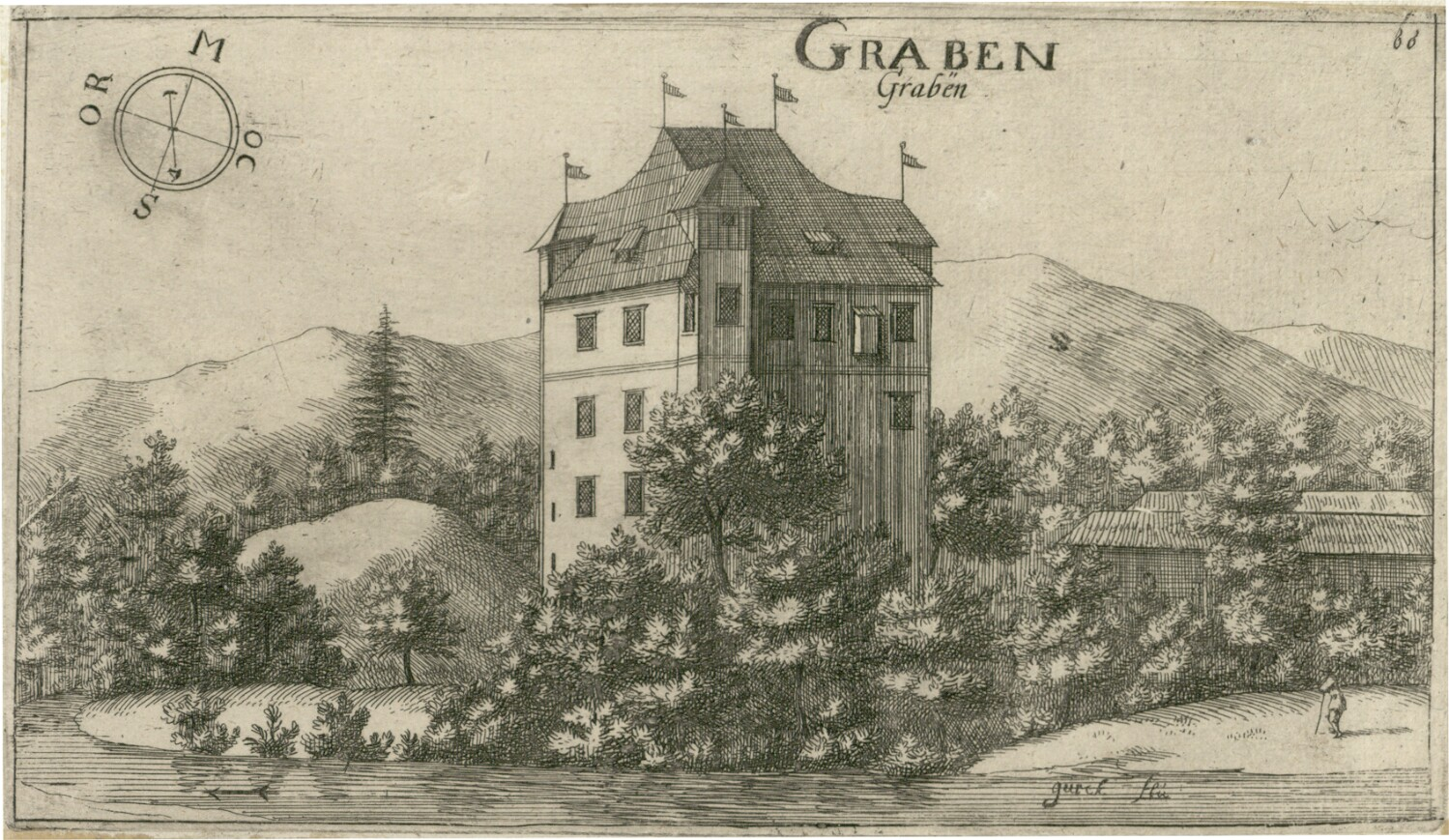
Castle Graben

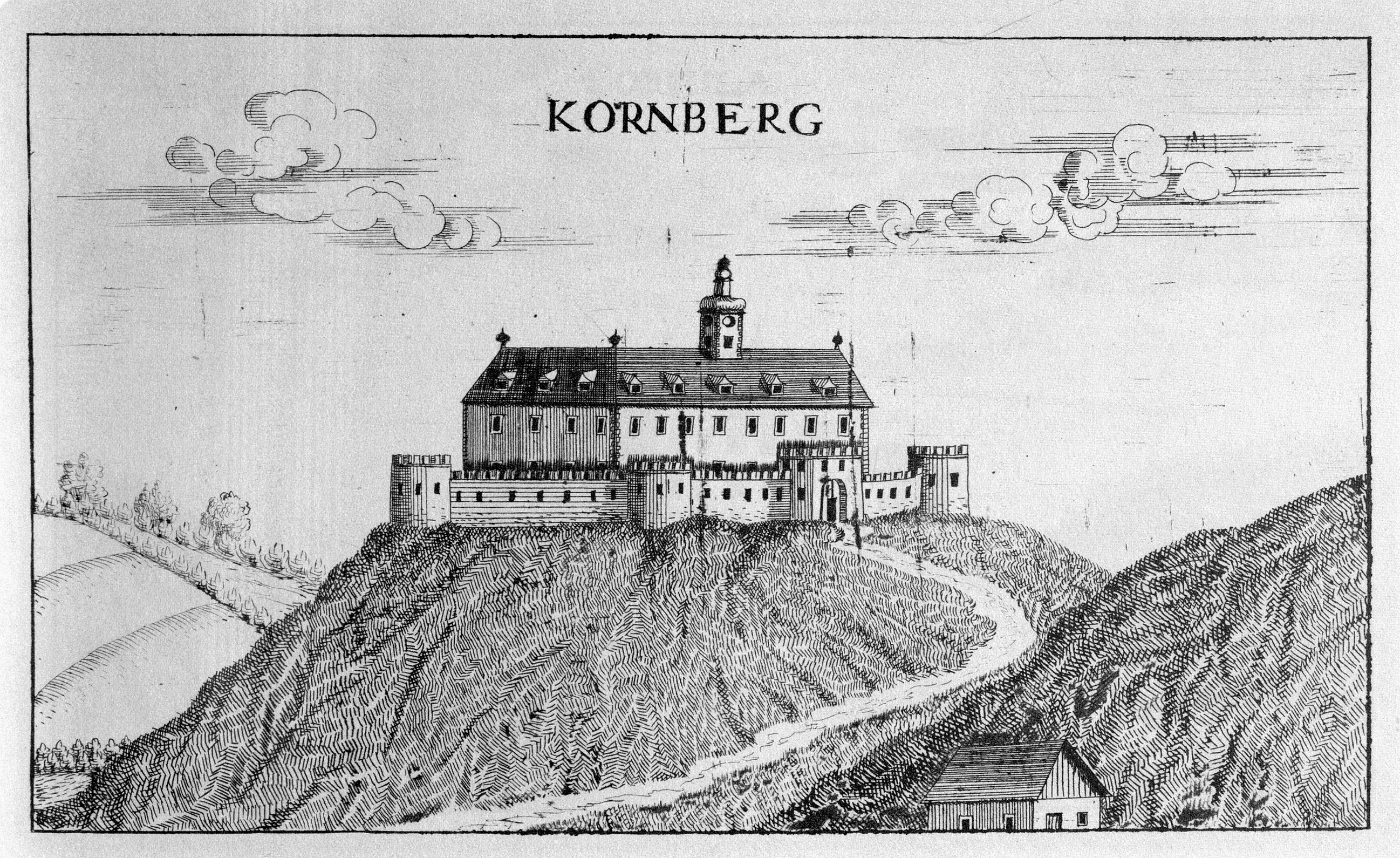
Schloss Kornberg

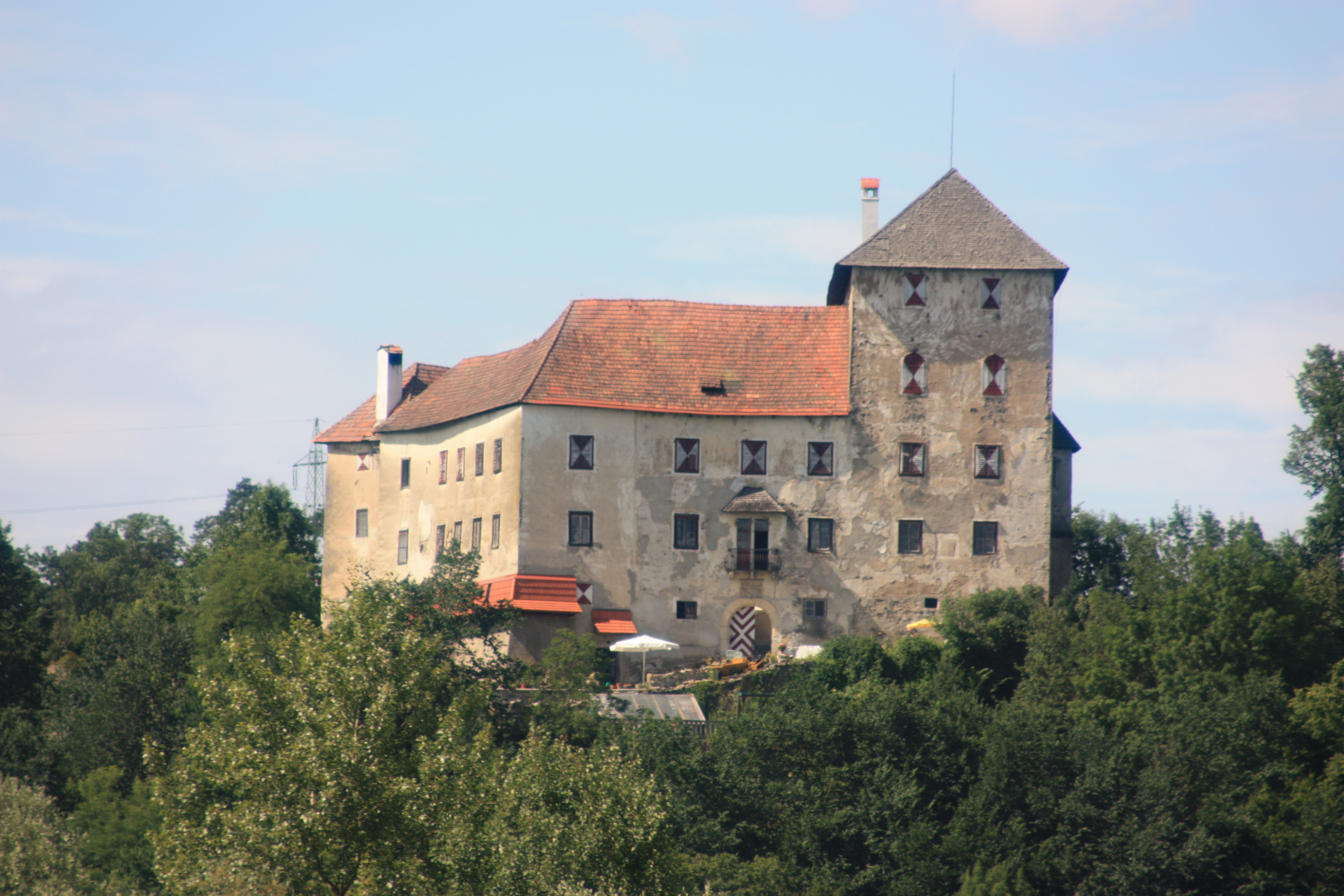
Schloss Neudenstein

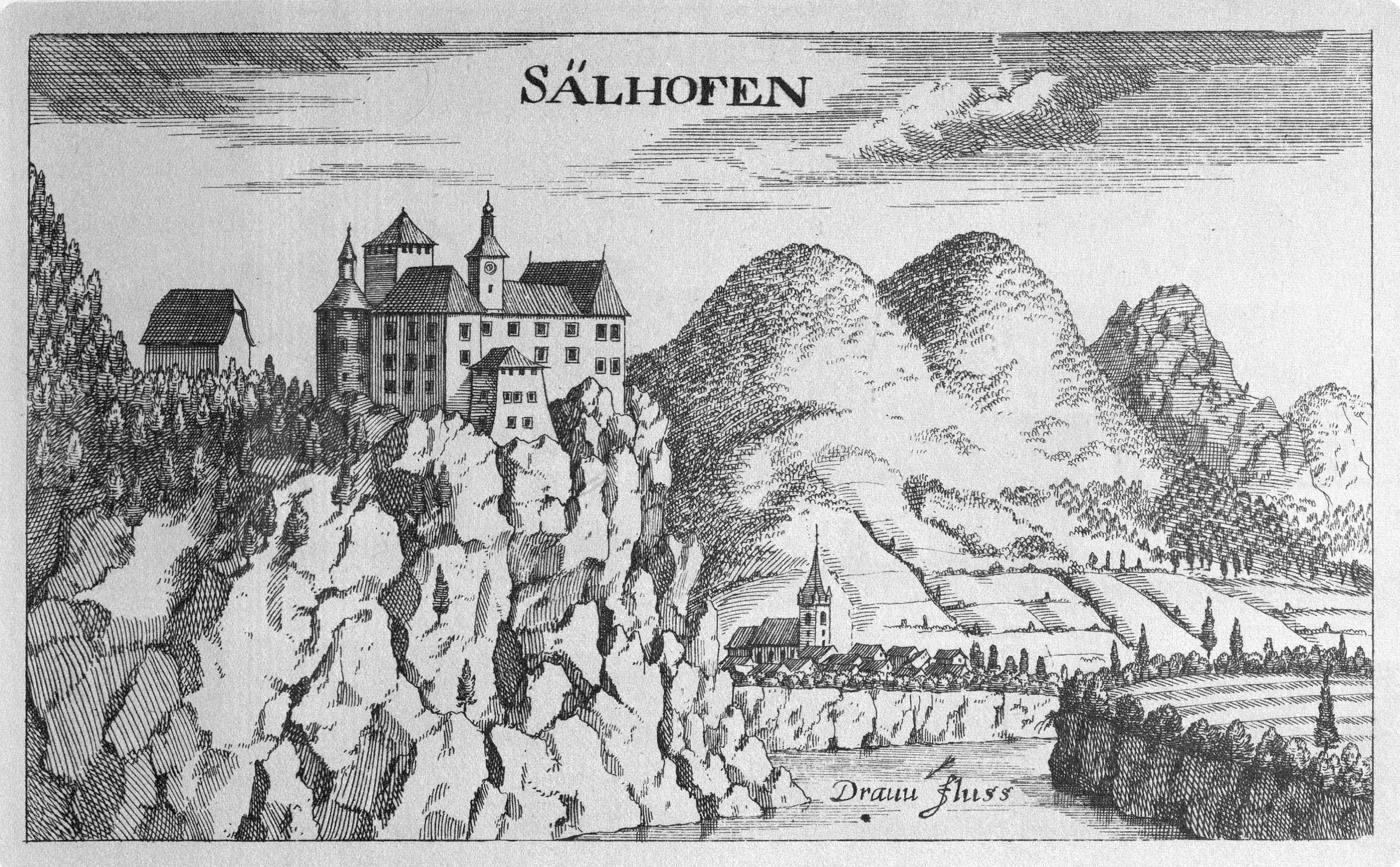
Castle Saldenhofen / Vuzenica (Saldenhofen)

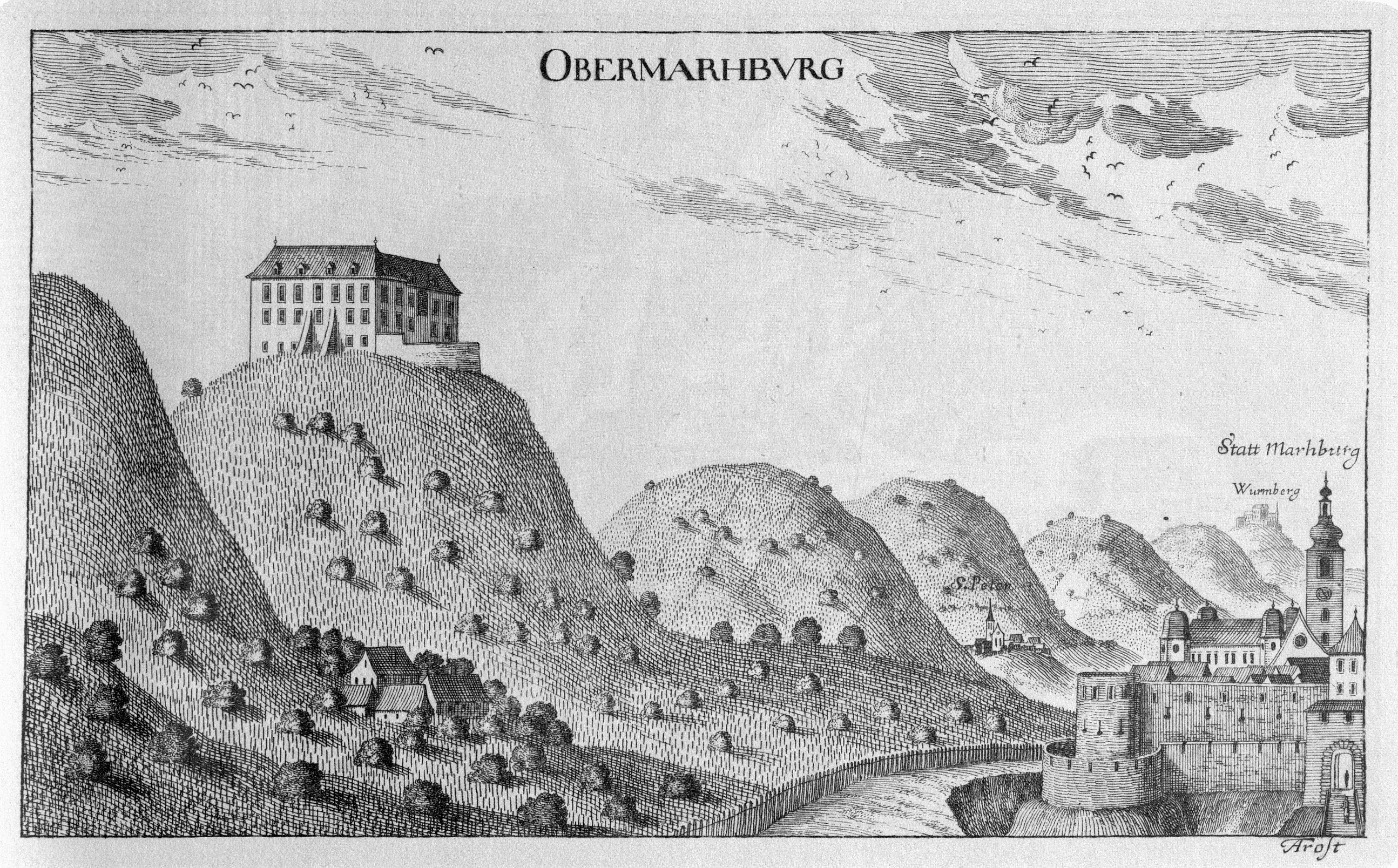
Obermarburg with Marburg an der Drau

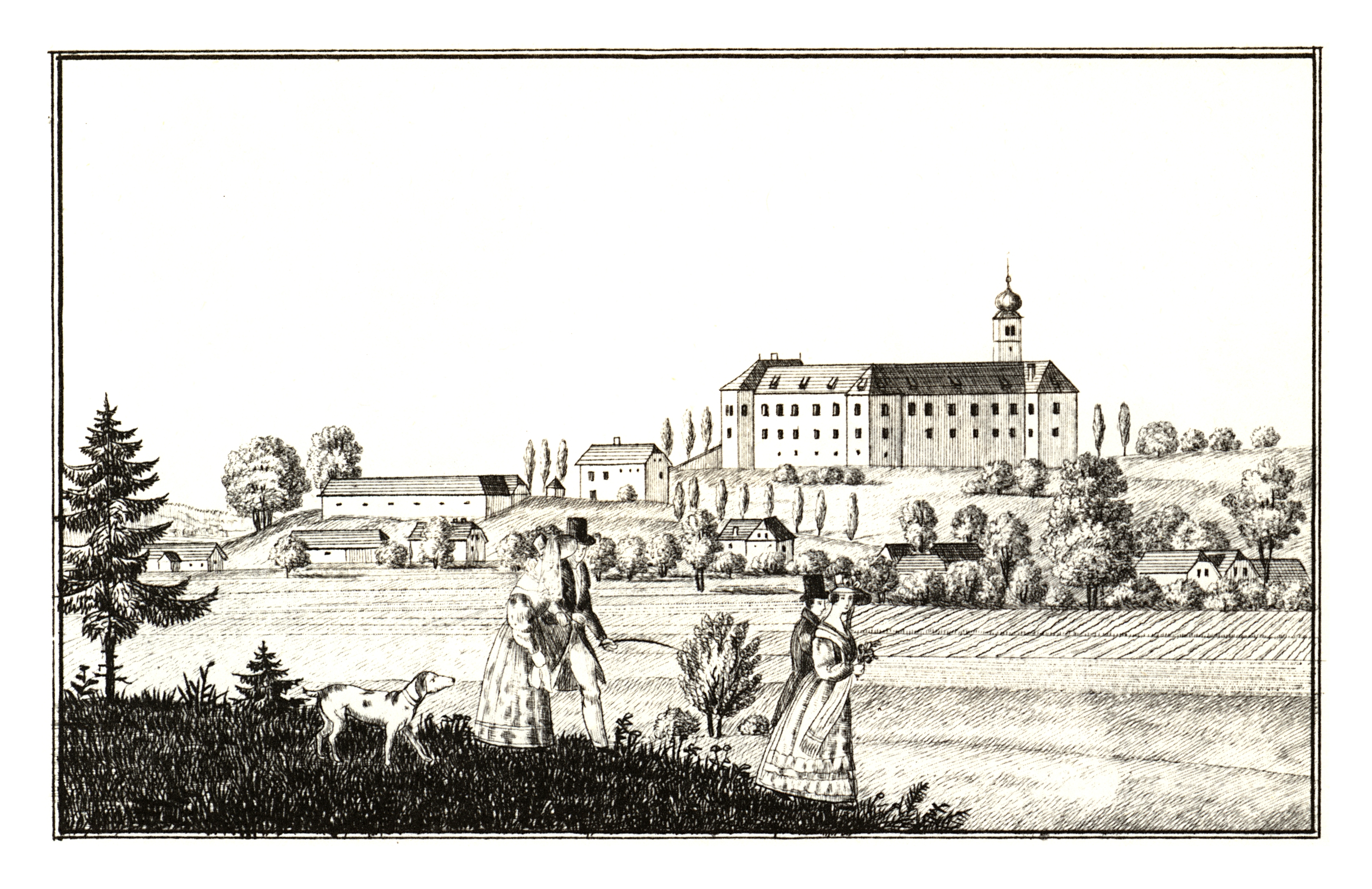
Schloss Weinburg

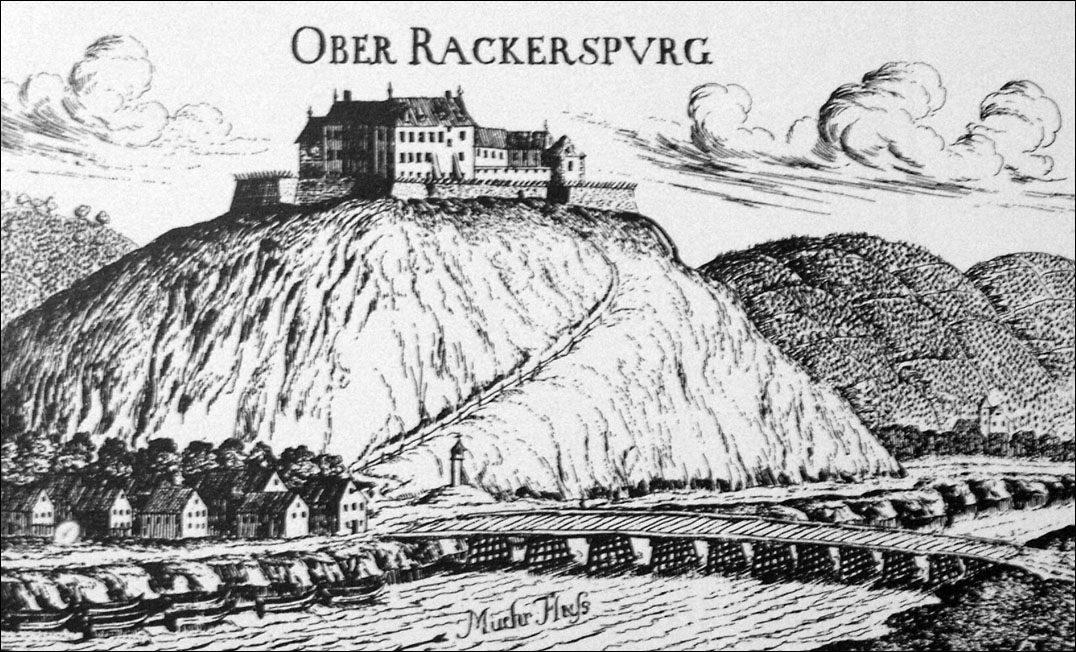
Schloss Oberradkersburg

== Descendants ==
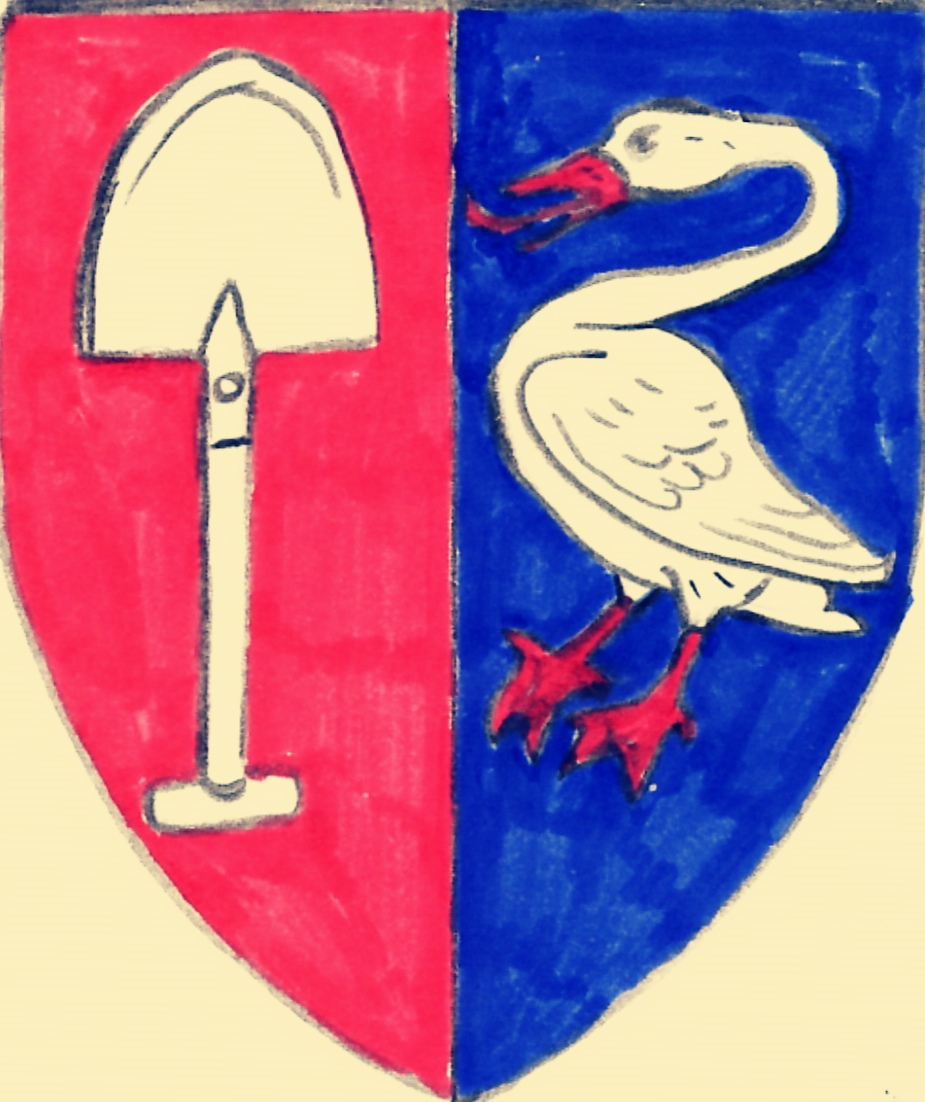
Ancient coat of arms Graeff. The family coat of arms with the silver spade on a red (Von Graben) and silver swan on a blue background (De Grebber) was first documented in 1543 by Jan Pietersz Graeff.

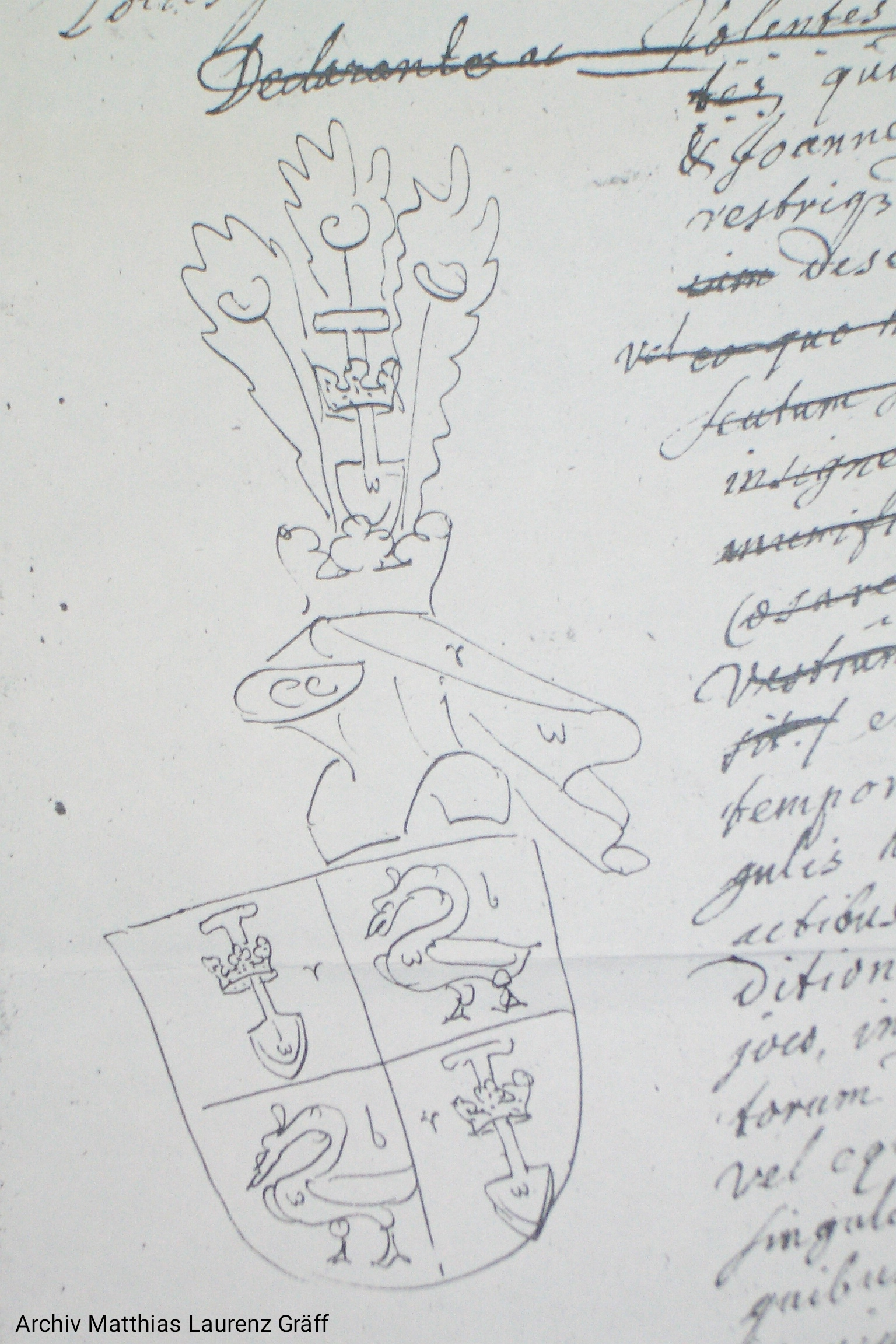
Coat of arms De Graeff (1677) as illegetime descandents of Wolfgang von Graben (private collection Matthias Laurenz Gräff, Austria)

The patrician family Graeff, De Graeff, probably had the Von Graben coat of arms with the shovel from the beginning. Their divided coat of arms was first documented with the shovel of the Graben (field 1) and the swan of the De Grebbers from Waterland (field 2) in 1543 in the coat of arms register of the Vroedschap of Amsterdam. Around 100 years and more later, during the Dutch Golden Age, the Amsterdam (de) Graeff family said that they descend from Wolfgang von Graben, who was in Holland between 1476 and 1483. In the Diploma of Nobility from July 19, 1677 loaned to Andries de Graeff and his son Cornelis de Graeff it was affirmed that the family De Graeff was formerly called von Graben.

Fide digis itegur genealogistarum Amsteldamensium edocti testimoniis te Andream de Graeff [Andries de Graeff] non paternum solum ex pervetusta in Comitatu nostro Tyrolensi von Graben dicta familia originem ducere, qua olim per quendam ex ascendentibus tuis ejus nominis in Belgium traducta et in Petrum de Graeff [Pieter Graeff], abavum, Johannem [Jan Pietersz Graeff], proavum, Theodorum [Dirck Jansz Graeff], avum, ac tandem Jacobum [Jacob Dircksz de Graeff], patrem tuum, viros in civitate, Amstelodamensi continua serie consulatum scabinatus senatorii ordinis dignitabitus conspicuos et in publicum bene semper meritos propagata nobiliter et cum splendore inter suos se semper gessaerit interque alios honores praerogativasque nobilibus eo locorum proprias liberum venandi jus in Hollandia, Frisiaque occidentale ac Ultrajectina provinciis habuerit semper et exercuerit.

=== Family Association ===
The globally active Family Association Gräff-Graeff (Familienverband Gräff-Graeff e.V.) was founded in 2013 as an association registered in Austria. The family association serves to get to know, communicate, exchange, search and bring together the Graeff families, the presumably natural descendants of the Austrian nobleman Wolfgang von Graben. The family association has several state representatives and has around 150 members. The president is the Austrian Matthias Laurenz Gräff. The chairmanship and administration of the Family Association must not be confused with the function of a head of the whole family and their different branches.

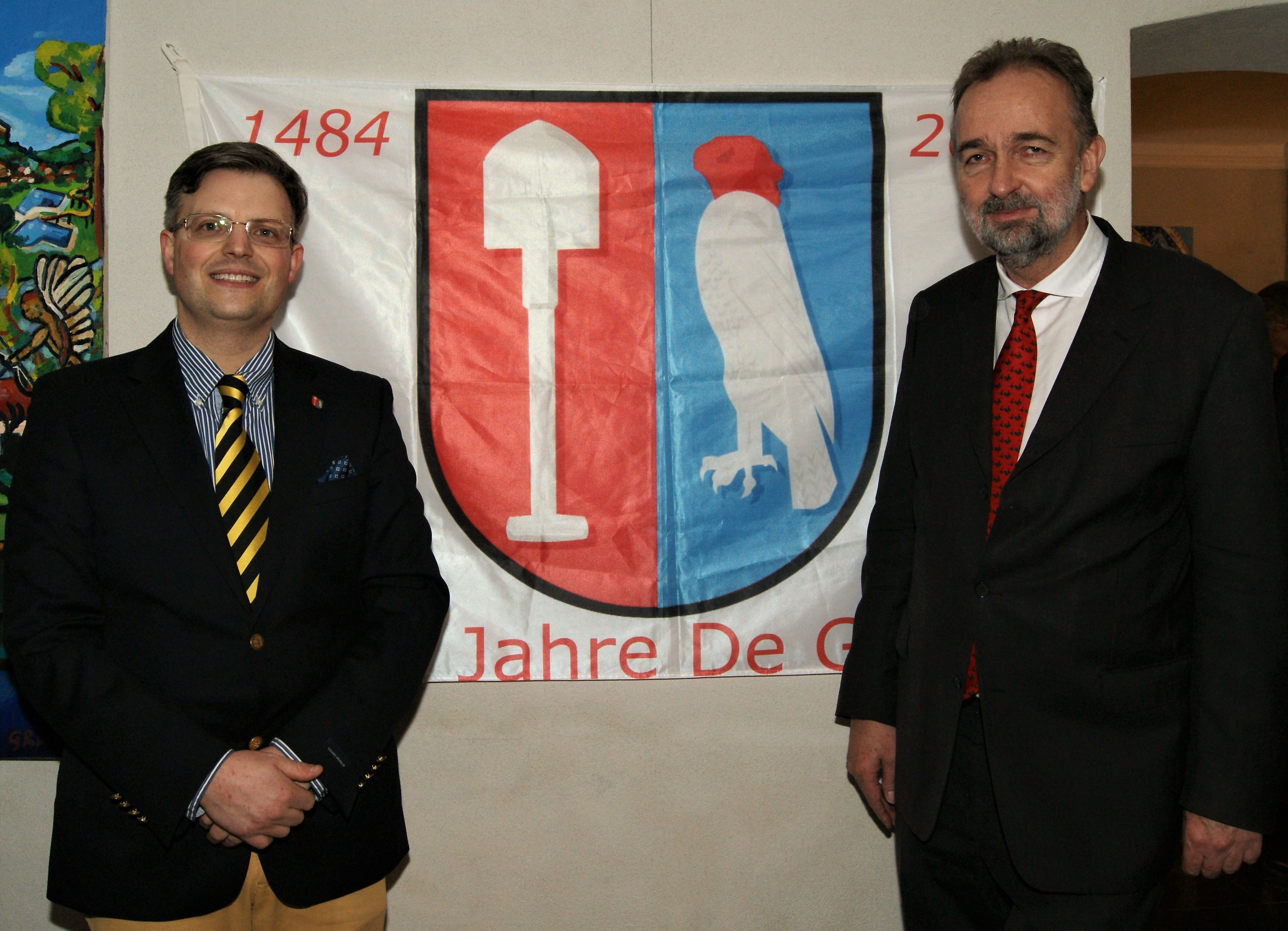
530 years De Graeff - celebrating the purported founding of the familyname in 1484 by Wolfgang von Grabens son Pieter Graeff. Family Association Chairman Matthias Laurenz Gräff and HIH Archduke Karl of Austria-Lorraine (Karl von Habsburg-Lothringen), head of the House Habsburg-Lorraine, the former imperial and royal house of the Holy Roman Empire and Austria
