= Von Stadl =

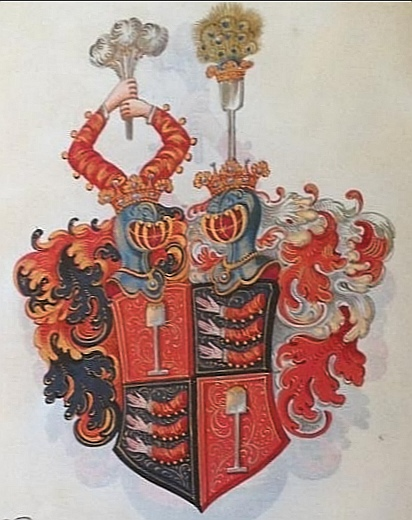
Coat of arms Lords and Barons von Stadl zu Kornberg

The Von Stadl family (also spelled Stadler or Stadel) was the name of an Austrian noble family from Styria, which also belonged to the provincial nobility in Lower Austria. The lords of Stadl from the Kornberg line were raised to barons, a side branch to imperial counts styled as Reichsgraf von und zu Stadel-Kornberg. The male line of the family died out at the end of the 19th century.

== History ==
The Stadl family was first mentioned in 1180 with Hugo von Stadl. The Knights of Stadl achieved great wealth and prestige in 1539 through the marriage of Christoph von Stadl to Anna von Graben, the heiress to the Lords von Graben zu Kornberg. Subsequently, Emperor Maximilian I. granted the Stadler dynasty the combination of their coat of arms with that of the lords of Graben (the Grabnerish with the upright spade). The inheritance of the lords of Graben included numerous and widely scattered lordships, estates and castles. This included the important lordship of Kornberg near Riegersburg with Kornberg Castle (1564–1825), as well as the Lordship Marburg, including the office and Marburg Castle, as well as Obermarburg Castle (Marburg an der Drau/Maribor, historically partly Marchburg; 1564 to around 1620 ). In addition, the inheritance included the possessions of Rohrbach an der Lafnitz, Grabenhofen with Alt-Grabenhofen Castle, Liechtenberg and Krottenhofen.

In 1597 the Stadl were elevated to the status of Baron. The Stadl family had their political heyday in the 16th and 17th centuries, where they provided, among other things, several military officers, politicians and provincial governors of Styria. In 1708, a branch of the family was elevated to the status of Imperial Count under the name von und zu Stadel-Kornberg. The Stadl family died out in 1882 through their baronial branch in the male

== Literature ==
- Genealogisches Taschenbuch der freiherrlichen Häuser, Gotha, Perthes, 1853, book 3, p 443 f. Digitalisat.
- Constantin von Wurzbach: "Stadl, die Freiherren von, Genealogie." In: Biographisches Lexikon des Kaiserthums Oesterreich (Biographical Lexicon of the Empire of Austria). Part 37 Kaiserlich-königliche Hof- und Staatsdruckerei, Vienna 1878, p. 48–50 (digitalised).
- Constantin von Wurzbach: "Stadl, die Freiherren von, Wappen." In: Biographisches Lexikon des Kaiserthums Oesterreich (Biographical Lexicon of the Empire of Austria). Part 37 Kaiserlich-königliche Hof- und Staatsdruckerei, Vienna 1878, p. 51 f. (digitalised).
- Ferdinand Krauss: Die Nordöstliche Steiermark. Graz, Leykam, 1888, S. 367–369 (Die Stadl auf Schloss Kornberg).
- Adalbert Sikora: Die Herren vom Graben. In: Zeitschrift des historischen Vereines.
