= Hohenwang Castle =

Castle ruin in Austria

Coordinates: 47.5553°N 15.6206°E

- Austria, Styria, above Langenwang
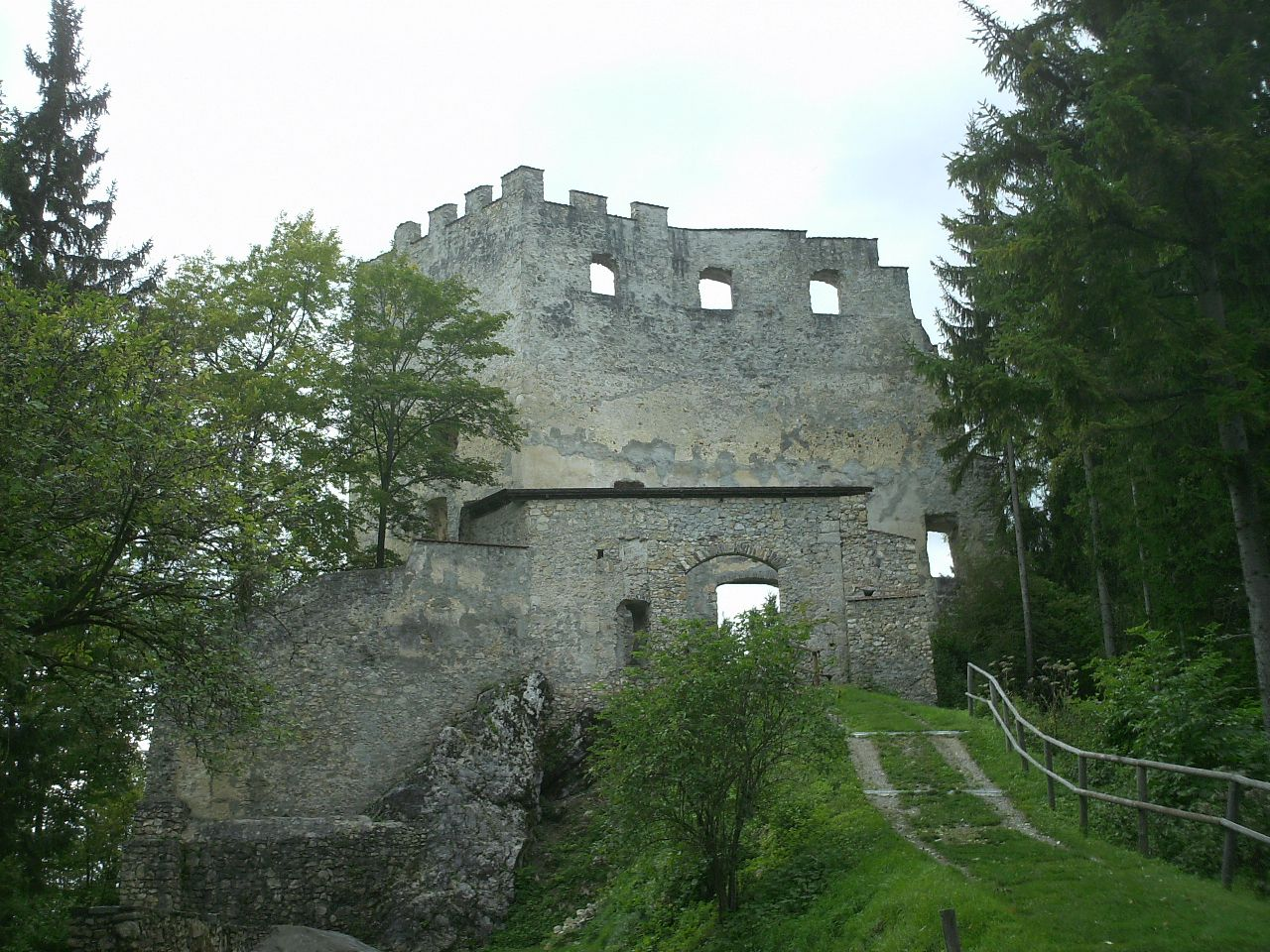
- Shield wall and gate 3 from east

Site information
- Type: Castle
- Owner: Schrack Company
- Open to the public: yes
- Condition: Ruined

Location
- Height: 700 m

Site history
- Built: 1122-1160
- Built by: Erchinger I. von Landesere
- In use: Until c. 1160
- Materials: stone
- Demolished: late 18th century

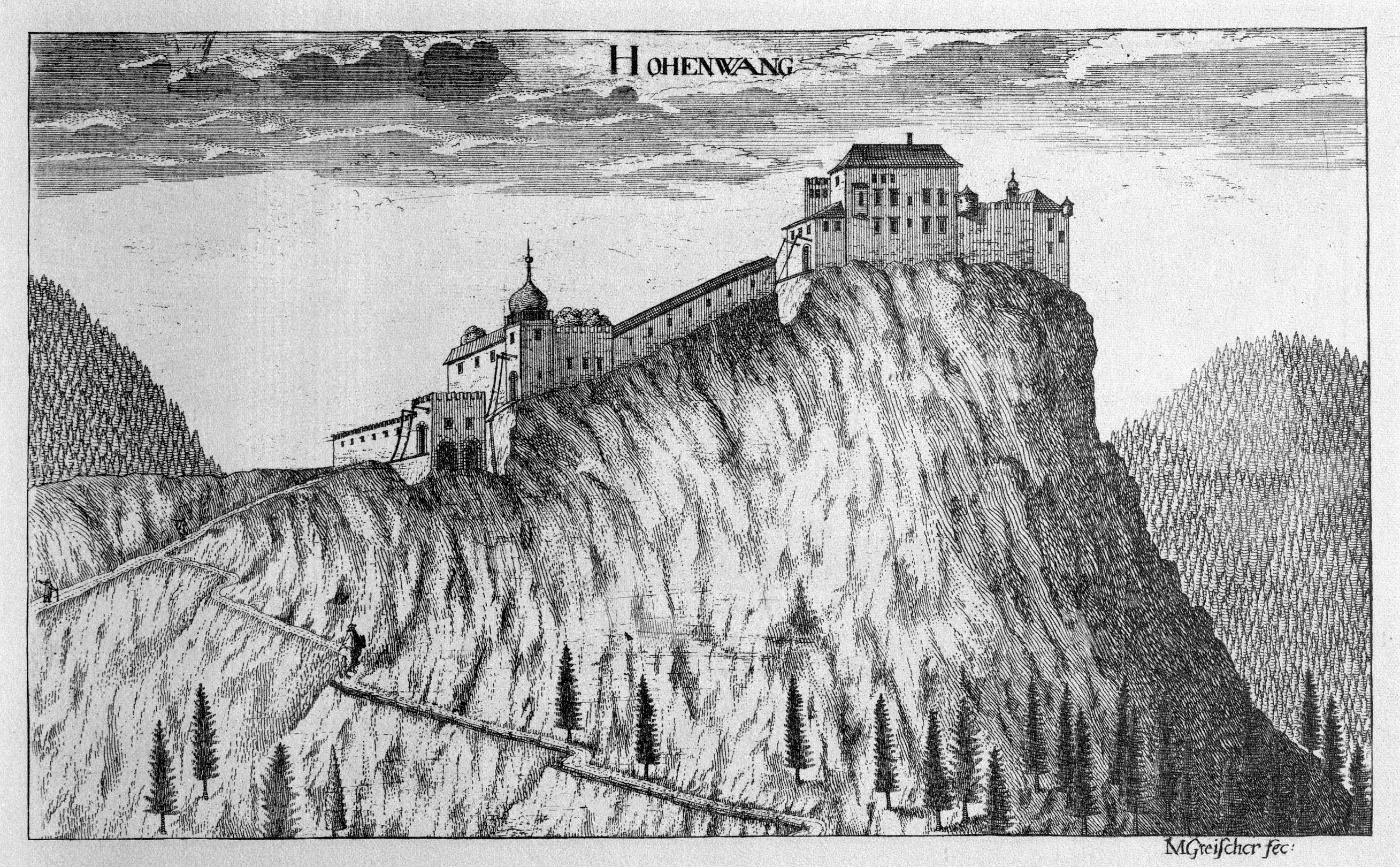
The castle around 1681, engraving by Georg Matthäus Vischer

Hohenwang is a ruined castle in Municipality of Langenwang, Styria, Austria. It stands on a hill at an elevation of 650 metres above sea level.

The castle, whose core dates back to the 12th century, is the symbol of Langenwang, and because of its exceptional length one of the largest castles in Styria.

It consists of a stronghold and two outworks, which are separated by trenches. The castle's massive decline began in the late 18th century, after it was severely damaged by an earthquake. During World War II more parts of the ruins were destroyed by bombing.

From the fortress, the shield wall of the high castle and the main gate are preserved in their perimeter today. The walls were mostly secured and renovated in the last 40 years by members of the Association Hohenwang castle.

Hohenwang served as a local administrative center, as protection of the population in times of crisis, and assisted in the spread of Christianity in the upper Muerztal. From the 13th century on, a priest resided at the castle.

Despite the regional importance their owners were allowed only to exercise the powers of the lower courts. Offenders who had been guilty of felony, had to be transferred to the district court in Kapfenberg.

It is an elongated complex with a stronghold, a deeper front castle with gatehouses and a curtain wall. It is oriented from southwest to northeast and extends over a total length of 90 meters. A donjon was not available. From the 13th to the 17th century, the romanesque core eastward to the Palas, a gallery, a kennel, a bastion and a representative gatehouse were enlarged. There exists a more detailed description of the interior of the castle in a 15th-century chronicle; a chapel, a servants' room, a large hall, four cellars, a bath-room, a kitchen and a stable for twelve horses are all mentioned. The three well-secured gates, - two of which provided with a slip gate - the attachment to the ditch and finally the very steep cliffs to the south, west and north made a storming of the fortress a difficult task. In addition to the engraving by Georg Matthäus Vischer, the castle is also shown on a proclamation image that had been given to Ulrich Christoph von Scherffenberg in 1631.

== Sources ==
- Othmar Pickl, Gerhard Wresounig: Chronik der Marktgemeinde Langenwang, 1997.
- Othmar Pickl, Amanda Bretterhofer: Geschichte der Marktgemeinde Krieglach, Selbstverlag der Gemeinde Krieglach, 1993.
- Kurt Woisetschläger, Peter Krenn (Hrsg.): Dehio Steiermark (ohne Graz). Schroll, Wien 1982, ISBN 3-7031-0532-1, S. 244.
- Robert Baravalle: Burgen und Schlösser der Steiermark. Eine enzyklopädische Sammlung der steirischen Wehrbauten und Liegenschaften, die mit den verschiedensten Privilegien ausgestattet waren. Mit 100 Darstellungen nach Vischer aus dem "Schlösserbuch" von 1681, Stiasny, Graz 1961.
- Herwig Ebner: Burgen und Schlösser Mürztal und Leoben, Birken Verlag, Wien 1965.
- Werner Murgg: Burgruinen der Steiermark. Mit Plänen von Martin Aigner sowie archäologischen Beiträgen von Manfred Lehner, Verlag Berger, Horn 2009.
- Franz Rauch: Hochschloss bei Langenwang in Steiermark einst und jetzt, Verlag U. Moser, Graz 1928.
- Mitteilungen des Steirischen Burgenvereines 1952, Band 5, Graz 1952.
- Otto Piper: Österreichische Burgen, Band 4, Verlag Friedrich Hölder, Wien 1905.
- Georg Clam Martinic: Österreichisches Burgenlexikon: Burgen und Ruinen, Ansitze, Schlösser und Palais, Landesverlag, Linz 1992, ISBN 3-85214-559-7.
- Gerhard Stenzel: Von Burg zu Burg in Österreich, Verlag Kremayr & Scheriau, Wien 1973, ISBN 3-218002-29-X.
- Zeitschrift des historischen Vereines für Steiermark, Selbstverlag, Graz 1954, darin: Othmar Pickl: Die Herrschaft Hohenwang. Ein Beitrag zur Besitzgeschichte des oberen Mürztales, S. 51-69

== See also ==
- List of castles in Austria
