= Schloss Kornberg =

Building in Riegersburg, Austria

Coordinates: 46.9810°N 15.8774°E

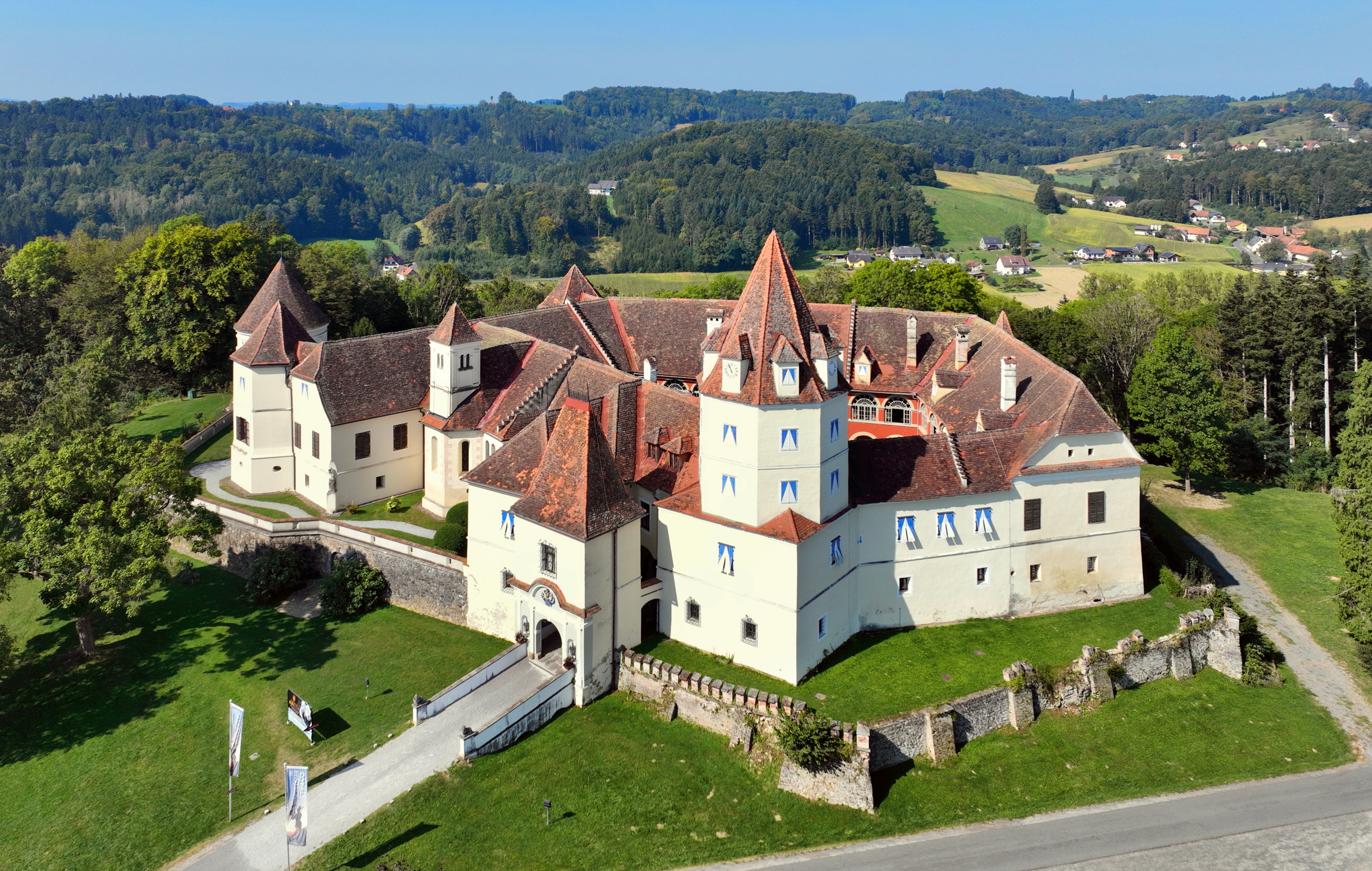
Schloss Kornberg

Schloss Kornberg is a castle at Kornberg near Riegersburg, Styria, Austria.

== History ==
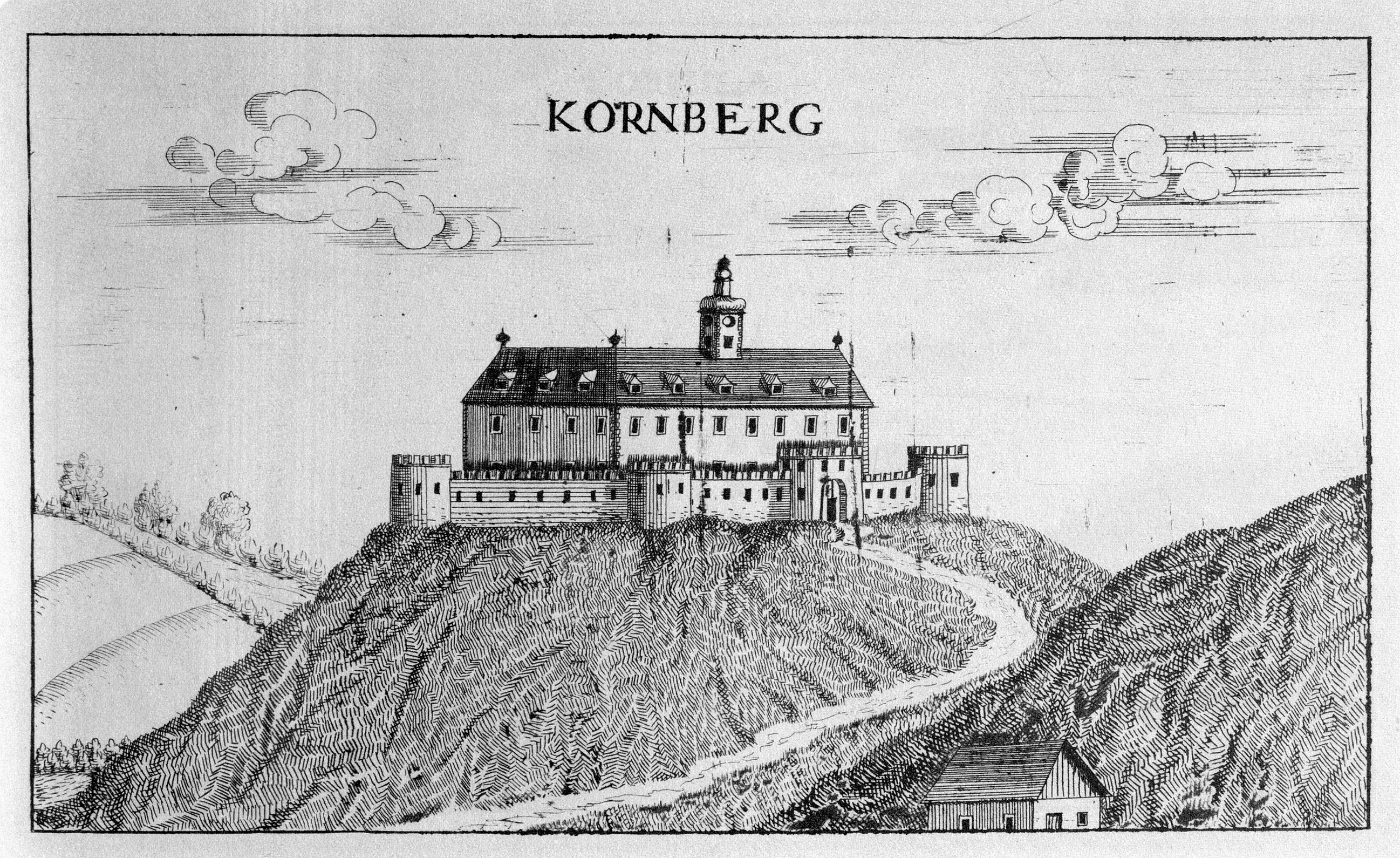
Schloss Kornberg, 1681

Kornberg Castle was first mentioned in documents in 1284. It originally served not as a residential but as a fortified complex of the Lords of Kornberg to the hungarian border.

In 1308 the Lords of Kornberg sold the Lordship and castle for financial reasons to the lords of Walsee. In 1328 the Walseer gave Kornberg as an Afterlehen to the Lords von Graben. Because of that the new family line changed their coat of arms, a blue diagonal left bar on silver, into a arms with a silver shovel on red. Later Kornberg came into their possession as an Allod and served as the administrative headquarter of the styrian branch of the family. After the death of Andrä von Graben in 1556 and the extinction of this line, the castle fall after many years of inheritance disputes to the sons of Andrä's sister Anna von Graben, the Lords and Counts von Stadl zu Kornberg as a Fideicommiss. Their offspring owned the castle until 1825. Afterwards they sold it to the House of Liechtenstein, and in 1871 the family of Charles Francois Bardeau become the new owners.
