= Lords of Walsee =

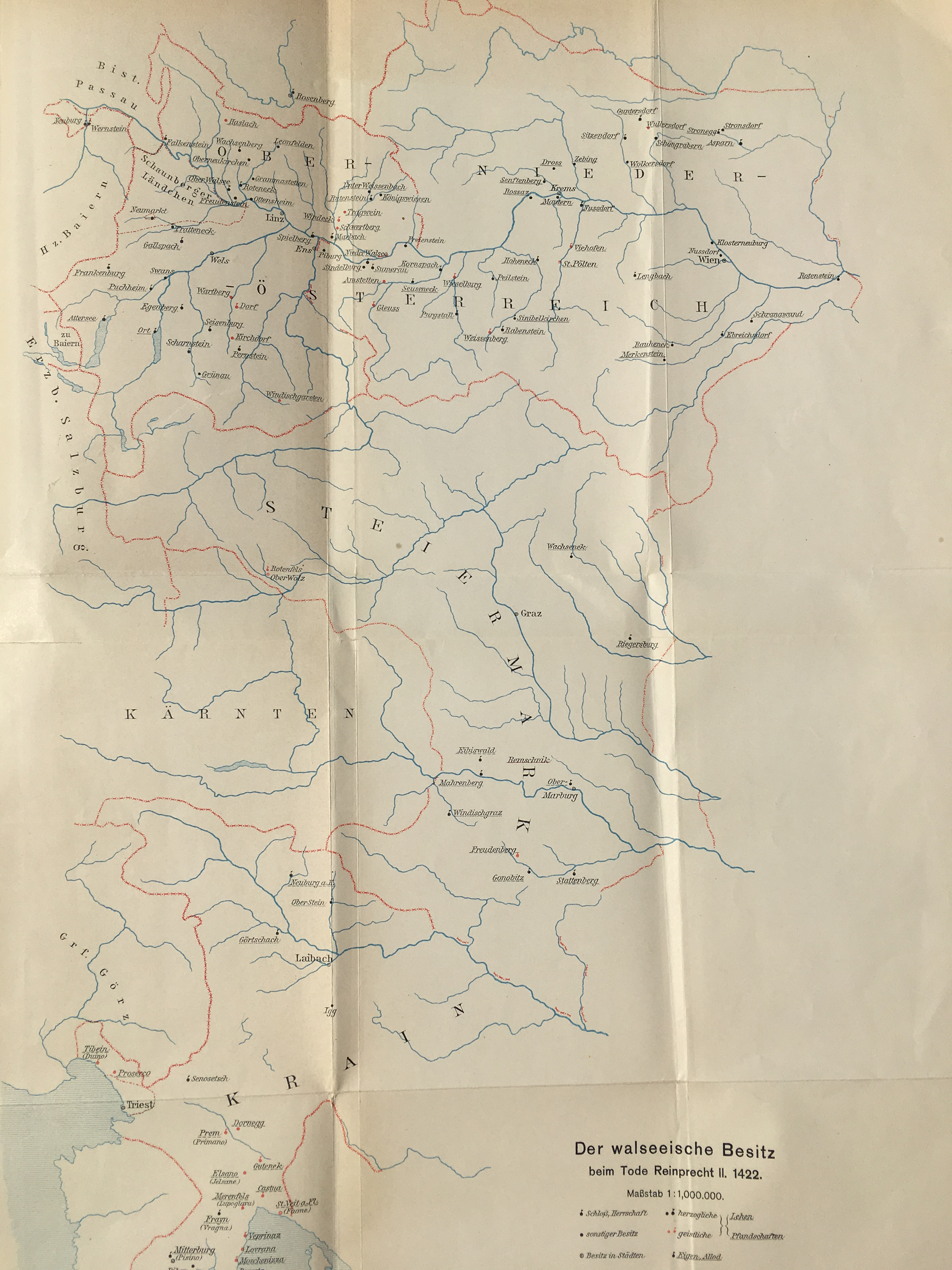
Map of the possessions of the lords of Wallsee in 1422, published in 1906

The Lords of Walsee (Note: Wallsee, Walchsee, Walse, Walsse, Wallssee, Waldze, Waldsee; Italian Valsa.) were a German noble family between the 13th and 15th centuries.

Taking their name from Bad Waldsee in Upper Swabia, they were originally ministerials (unfree knights) in the service of the abbey of Weissenburg and the Staufers. They grew wealthy in the space between the Danube and the Iller. Under the patronage of a Habsburg king, either Rudolf I or Albert I, they came to the Ennstal. In 1331, they sold Bad Waldsee to the Habsburgs.

By the acquisition of various lordships, they established several lines in Upper Austria. The lines of Linz and Drosendorf went extinct in 1400, that of Enns in 1483 and that of Graz in 1363. They frequently held the office of Hauptmann (governor) in Lower Austria and Styria. During the feudal wars at the end of the 13th century they expanded their possessions in some parts of the Croatian-Hungarian Kingdom. Ulrich I. von Walsee became lord of Međimurje in northern Croatia.

In 1395, they acquired Duino Castle after the extinction of the local lords. They also acquired Fiume and the coast in 1400. In 1465 and 1471, the Emperor Frederick III was confirmed as heir to Fiume.
