= Lukas von Graben zum Stein =

Lukas von Graben zum Stein (until 1500 Lukas von Graben) († 1550 at Stein Castle), lord of Stein, Schwarzenegg and Weidenburg, pledger of Heinfels, was a Carinthian-Gorizian nobleman and military leader of the Counts of Gorizia and the Habsburgs. In the succession dispute over the princely County of Gorizia at the end of the 15th century, Von Graben acted as deputy of his father Virgil von Graben, administrator of Gorizia, and defender of the rights of the Habsburgs against the aspirations of the Republic of Venice. In 1518 he was one of 70 representatives in the first Austrian general parliament of Emperor Maximilian I in Innsbruck.

== Biography ==
=== Family von Graben ===
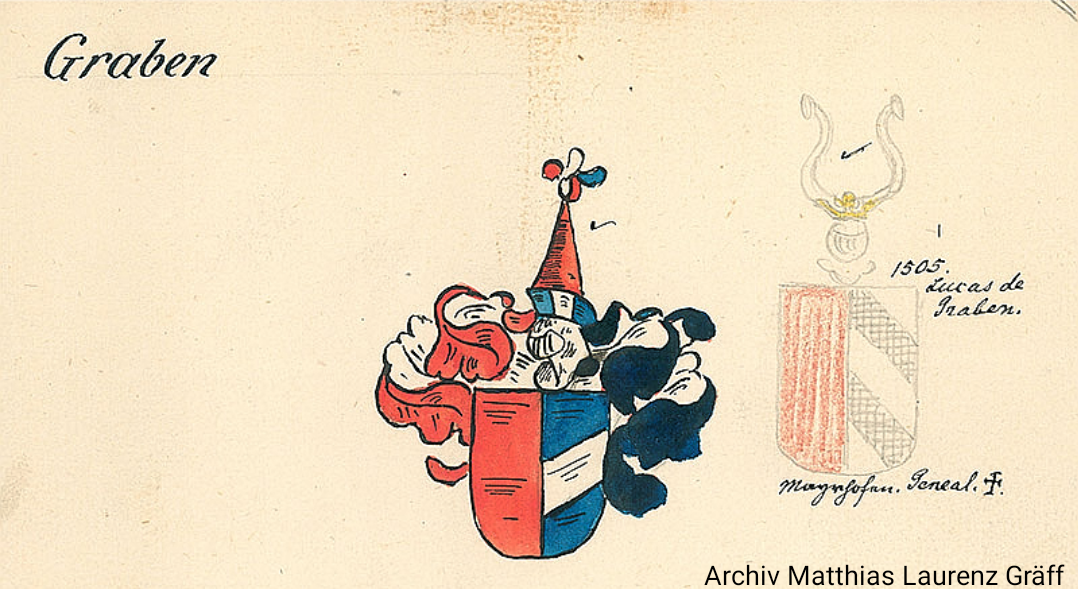
Coat of arms Lukas von Graben zum Stein

Lukas von Graben came from the Sommeregger line of Von Graben, whose members held important offices at the time of the last Counts of Gorizia, and through whose work the Renaissance culture also found its way into East Tyrol. He was a son of the important nobleman Virgil von Graben of the Von Graben family and Dorothea Arnold, née Herbst von Herbstenburg. However, since this marriage was not legally binding, his children could not accept their father's inheritance. One of his cousins was Ladislaus Prager, Hereditary Marshal of the duchy of Carinthia and Chamberlain of Emperor Frederik III.

According to Bucelin, Lukas von Graben was married to a daughter of Georg Hellssen, with whom he had three daughters and two sons, who inherited the Stein fief:

- Margaretha von Graben zum Stein, married to Leopold Göstels von Mülbach (1542)
- N of Graben zum Stein, married N of Moors
- Catharina von Graben zum Stein, married Christoph Mühlsteuers in Flaschberg in 1540
- Hans von Graben zum Stein, the older († 1587–91), married to Anna Straufen and remarried in 1576 with Margarita Manndorfferin (von Manndorff), Lord of Stein
- Georg von Graben zum Stein (mentioned 1570; † 1595), Lord of Stein; married to Kunigunde (née Von Gendorf, widow Von Vasold) no descendants; Lord of Stein

==== Heritage ====
Lukas von Graben was unable to take over his father's inheritance due to his father's illegal marriage. As a result, the von Graben family lost the important fief of Sommeregg. The inheritance passed to Lukas von Graben's cousin Rosina von Graben von Rain and to the barons von Rain zu Sommeregg. Lukas was enfeoffed by the emperor with Heinfels, the manor and castle Schwarzenegk (Schwarzenegg) on the Karst, Črni Vrh (Divača in Slovenia), and the manor and Stein Castle. In 1500 he was given the suffix Zum Stein by the later Emperor Maximilian I. Stein remained in the family until 1664.

=== Career ===
==== Controversy over the County of Gorizia ====
When the last Count of Gorizia, Leonhard, was about to die at the end of the 15th century, the two neighboring states, the Austrian Habsburg monarchy and the Republic of Venice, began to fight the inheritance. In 1498 Lukas von Graben was given command of the gorizian Burghut, the defense of the capital and residential city of Gorizia and its surroundings, by his father Virgil von Graben, kaptein (governor) of the County of Gorizia. The Venetians tried to win over Lukas von Graben, but he refused, also because of his father's strict guidelines. The Venice Council of Ten offered to appoint Lukas von Graben as their supreme commander in Friuli. However, since Virgil von Graben ended the contract with Venice about the succession in the County of Gorizia and negotiated with Emperor Maximilian, this appointment was no longer made. Equipped with precise instructions from his father, Lukas von Graben intervened as commander of the Gorizia troops in the war with the Republic of Venice. But since his attempts also failed, Friuli and the city of Gorizia were handed over to the Venetian troops in 1500. A short time later Gorizia was won back by imperial troops for Maximilian of Austria. After the Gorizian inheritance in favor of the Habsburgs, the Venetians saw their failure solely in the actions of Messrs Virgil and Lukas von Graben. Lukas von Graben and his father were modestly rewarded in relation to their immense merits.

==== Imperial service ====
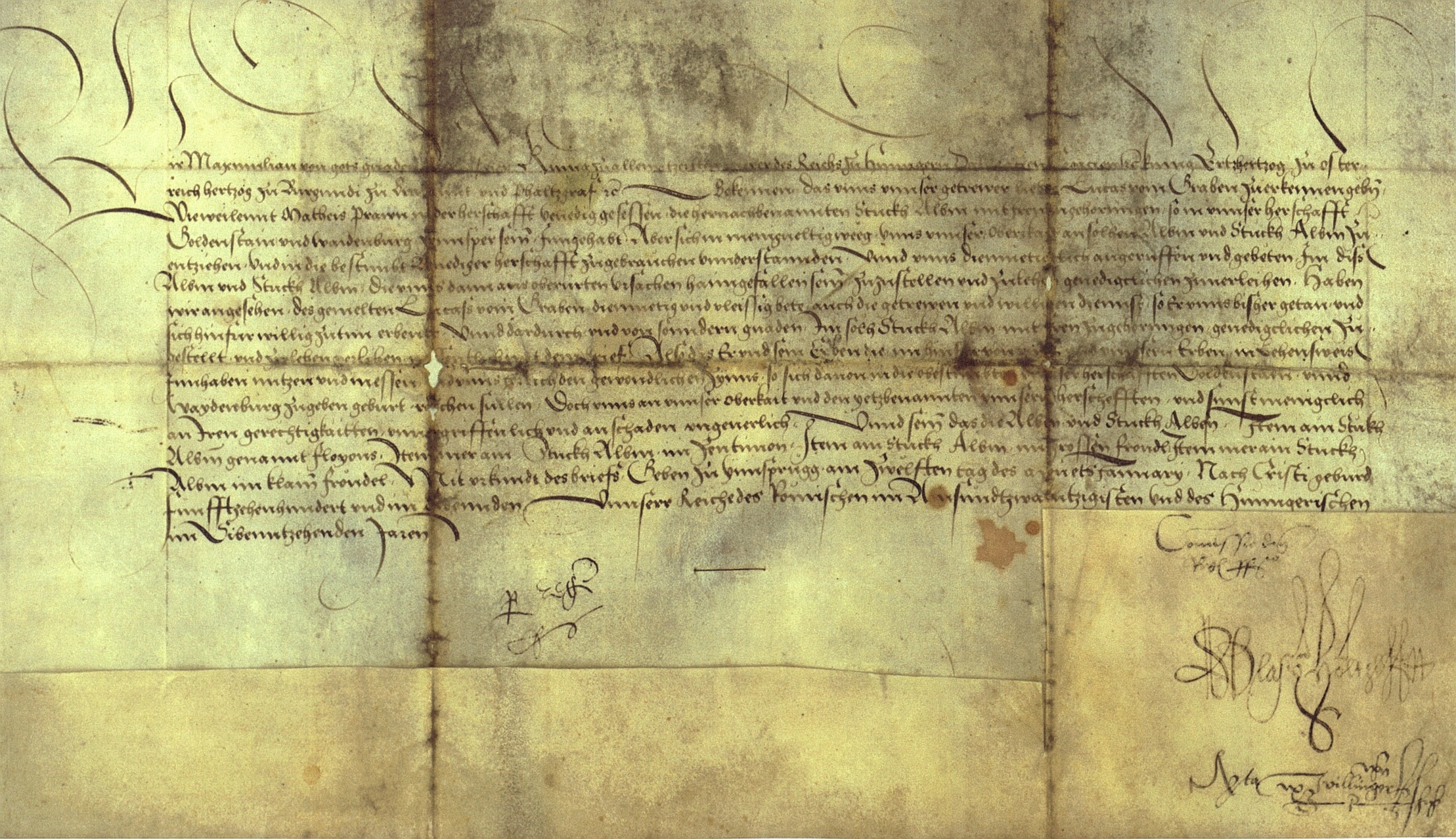
King and later Emperor Maximilian lend Lukas von Graben zum Stein properties and alpine pastures in the Carnic Alps in 1507

In 1500, Emperor Maximilian gave his "loyal, dear" Lukas von Graben the dominion of Stein as a fief due to his "great services" in winning the County of Gorizia.

During the Venetian War of 1508, Von Graben zum Stein belonged to the Lienz War Chamber as Chief Provisioner (a sort of Purser) under the Supreme Commissioner Erich I of Brunswick-Lüneburg.

Lukas von Graben zum Stein was in the favor of Emperor Maximilian throughout his life, so he demanded on 25 October 1514, in his instruction to the Krainer councils and the commissaries of the Krain (Carniola) estates that, among other things, "Our faithful dear Lucas von Grabn zum Stain near Traberg servants from our county of Tyrol" to strengthen the defense against the Republic of Venice. From January to May 1518 he was one of the three Pustertal and Lienz deputies to the first Austrian General State Parliament (Reichstag) of Emperor Maximilian in Innsbruck, which included 70 representatives from the Austrian states. This assembly is considered the first all-Austrian parliament and is an important step in the formation of the Austrian state. In 1524, Lukas von Graben zum Stein was named as councilor and commissioner of the Counter-Reformation of Carinthia by Ferdinand I, the future Holy Roman Emperor.
