= Graben (disambiguation) =

Graben (German for ditch) may refer to:

- Graben, a kind of geological depression.

== Places ==
- Graben, Bavaria, a municipality in the district of Augsburg
- Graben, Switzerland, a municipality in the canton of Bern
- Graben, Ribnica, a village in the Municipality of Ribnica, southern Slovenia
- Graben, a locality of the Graben-Neudorf municipality in Baden-Württemberg
- Graben, Vienna, a famous street in Vienna
- former name of Spodnje Stranice, a village in the municipality of Zreče, northeastern Slovenia

== People ==
- House of Graben von Stein, Austrian noble family
- Andreas von Graben (d. 1463), Carinthian knight and burgrave in the County of Ortenburg
- Friedrich II von Graben (d. before 1463), Austrian noble, Imperial councillor and burgrave
- Rosina von Graben von Rain (d. 1534 (?)), Austrian noblewoman
- Ulrich I von Graben (d. before 1325), Austrian noble and burgrave
- Ulrich II von Graben (d. about 1361), Austrian noble and burgrave
- Ulrich III von Graben (d. 1486), Austrian noble, burgrave and Landeshauptmann of Styria
- Virgil von Graben (d. 1507), son of Andreas, Austrian noble and official in the County of Görz
- Wolfgang von Graben (d. 1521), son of Ulrich III, Austrian official.

== See also ==
- Grabner
