= Lengberg Castle =

Castle in East Tyrol, Austria

Coordinates: 46°47′49″N 12°53′30″E

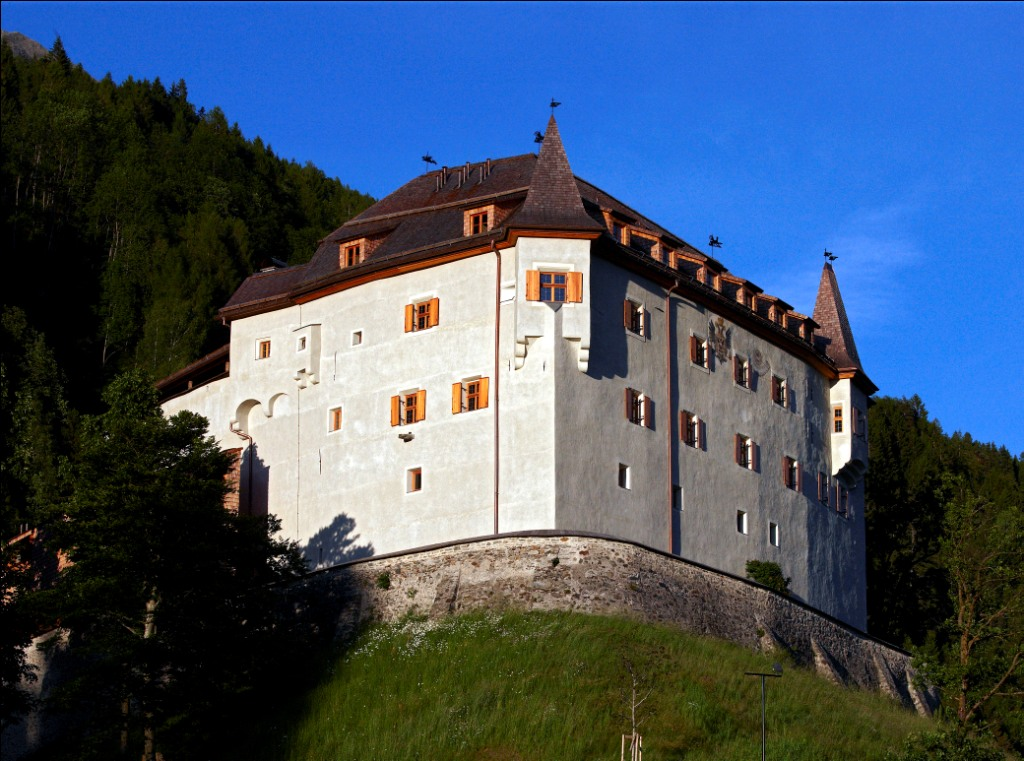
Lengberg Castle in Nikolsdorf, Austria

Lengberg Castle is a castle in Nikolsdorf, East Tyrol, Austria, about 13 kilometres (8.1 mi) east of Lienz.

== History ==
The castle was built by the Counts of Lechsgemünde beginning in the late 12th century, and came under the control of the Archbishop of Salzburg in the 13th century.

During the 15th century, a second storey was added to the structure by Austrian noble Virgil von Graben. In 1485, the castle's chapel was completely rebuilt, and was consecrated by the Bishop of Caorle, Pietro Carlo, in October of that year. Both the addition of the second storey and the chapel construction were recorded by Paolo Santonino, an Italian humanist known for his travel diaries. The area was ceded to the Kingdom of Bavaria during the Napoleonic Wars and was returned to Austrian control after the Congress of Vienna.

Lengberg Castle passed into private ownership beginning in 1821. It was used as a hospital during an 1831 cholera epidemic. After it was purchased by a Dutch businessman in the early 20th century, the castle was extensively renovated to return it to a habitable state.

A reconstruction project in 2008 uncovered a hidden vault on the second floor – likely built during the addition of the upper level – containing debris from the 15th century. Professor Harald Stadler of the University of Innsbruck led an archaeological investigation of the material in the vault. Discoveries include shirts, shoes, and undergarments. Notably, there were four linen bras, one of which greatly resembled the modern bra, with traces of lace-making around the edges. The Museum of London's fashion curator Hilary Davidson has described the discovery as "'kind of a missing link' in the history of women's underwear," because fashion historians have long believed that functional bras were invented only about 100 years ago.
