= Graubner =

Graubner is a surname. Notable people with the surname include:

- Carl-Alexander Graubner (born 1957), German civil engineer and professor
- Gotthard Graubner (1930–2013), German painter
- Jan Graubner (born 1948), Czech Roman Catholic archbishop
- Reinhard Graubner (1915–1986), German Luftwaffe pilot

== See also ==
- Grabner
- Graebner
