= Seeboden am Millstätter See =

Seeboden
- Municipality
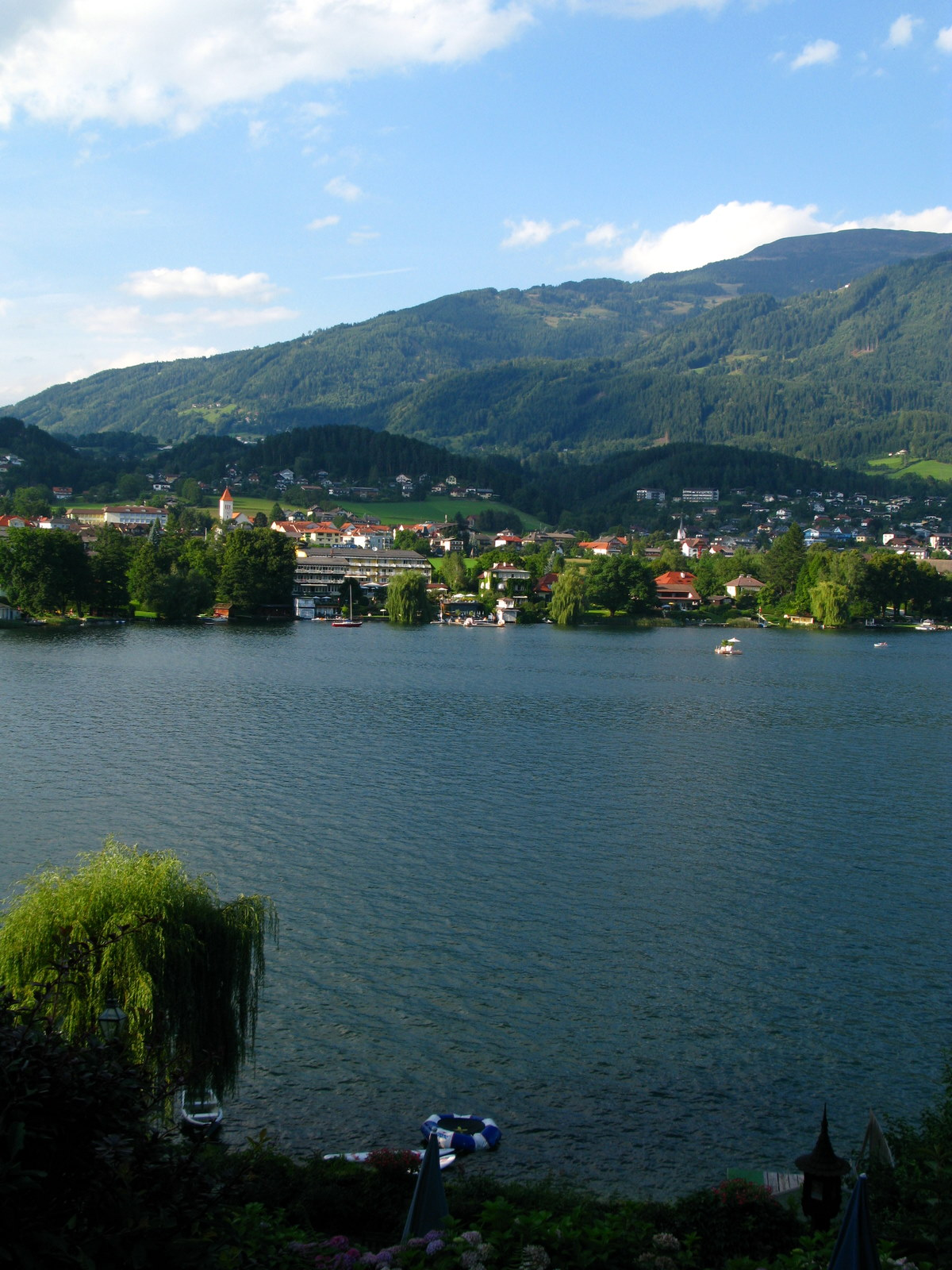
- View from Millstätter See

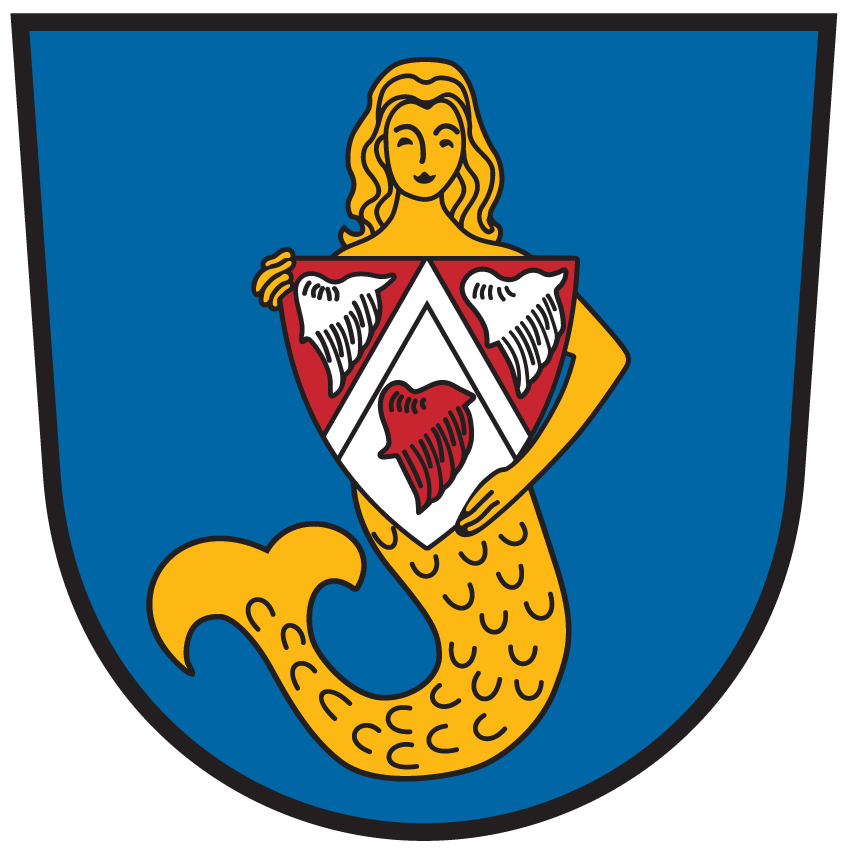
- Coat of arms

- Location within Austria
- Coordinates: 46°49′N 13°31′E
- Country: Austria
- State: Carinthia
- District: Spittal an der Drau

Government
  - Mayor: Thomas Schäfauer (SPÖ)

Area
  - Total: 44.41 km^{2} (17.15 sq mi)
- Elevation: 618 m (2,028 ft)

Population (2018-01-01)
  - Total: 6,418
  - Density: 144.5/km^{2} (374.3/sq mi)
- Time zone: UTC+1 (CET)
  - Summer (DST): UTC+2 (CEST)
- Postal code: 9871
- Area code: 04762
- Website: www.seeboden.at

Seeboden am Millstätter See (Slovene: Jezernica) is a market town in Spittal an der Drau District in Carinthia, Austria.

== Geography ==
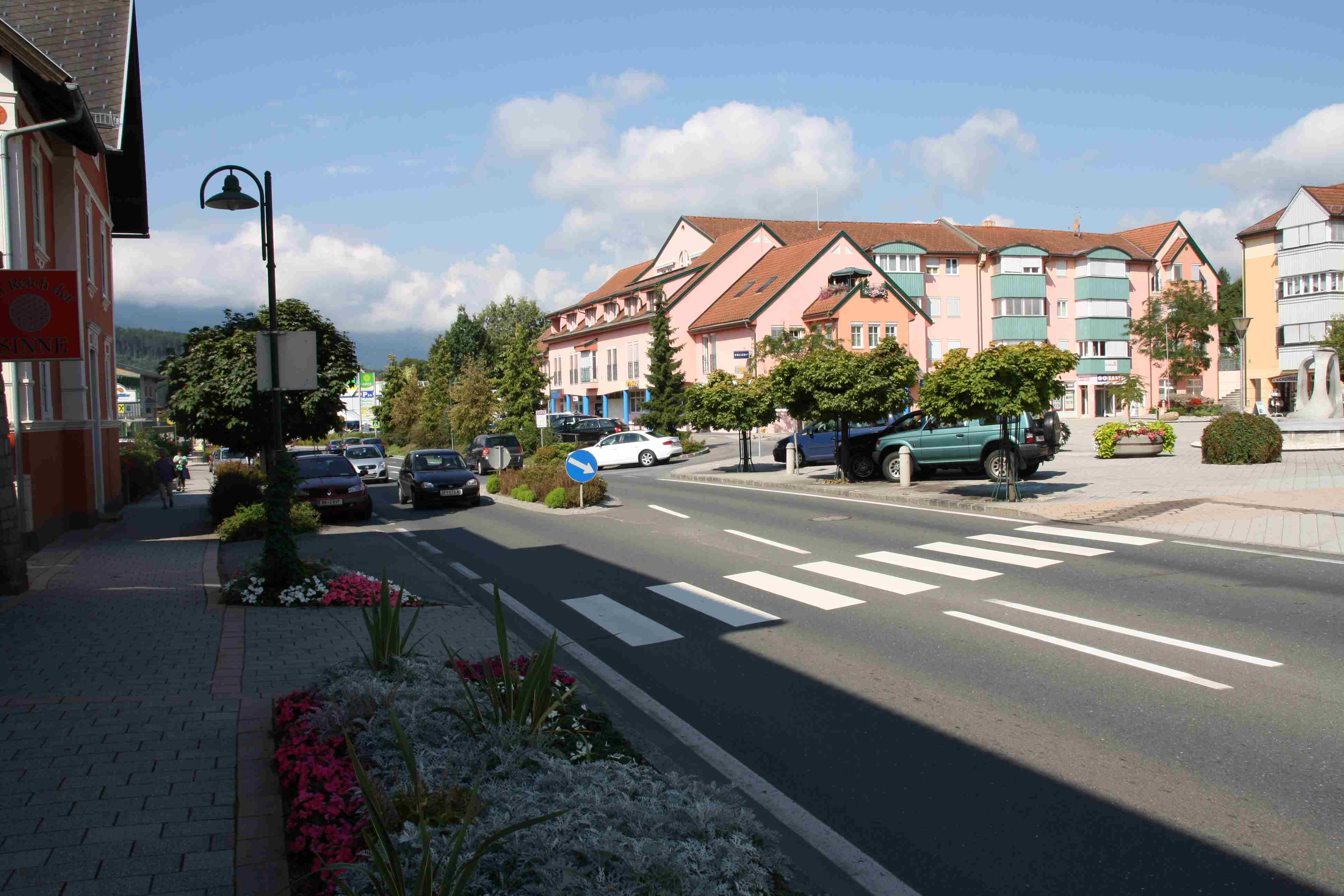
Main square

The municipal area stretches from the western shore of Millstätter See to the town boundary of the district capital Spittal an der Drau. In the north it reaches up to Mt. Tschiernock at 2,088 m (6,850 ft), part of the Millstätter Alpe crest in the Nock Mountains.

=== Divisions ===
The municipal area consists of the four cadastral communities Lieseregg, Lieserhofen, Seeboden and Treffling. It comprises 22 villages and hamlets (population in 2001 in parentheses):

- Am Tschiernock (0)
- Kötzing (108)
- Karlsdorf (155)
- Kolm (58)
- Kras (98)
- Liedweg (69)
- Lieserbrücke (815)
- Lieseregg (3)
- Lieserhofen (547)
- Litzldorf (23)
- Lurnbichl (227)
- Muskanitzen (38)
- Pirk (103)
- Raufen (5)
- Sankt Wolfgang (33)
- Schloßau (87)
- Seebach (78)
- Seeboden (2783)
- Tangern (192)
- Trasischk (36)
- Treffling (468)
- Unterhaus (119)

Seeboden proper is a dispersed settlement area that grew together from the former villages of Gritschach, Kraut, Reich, and Wirlsdorf.

== History ==
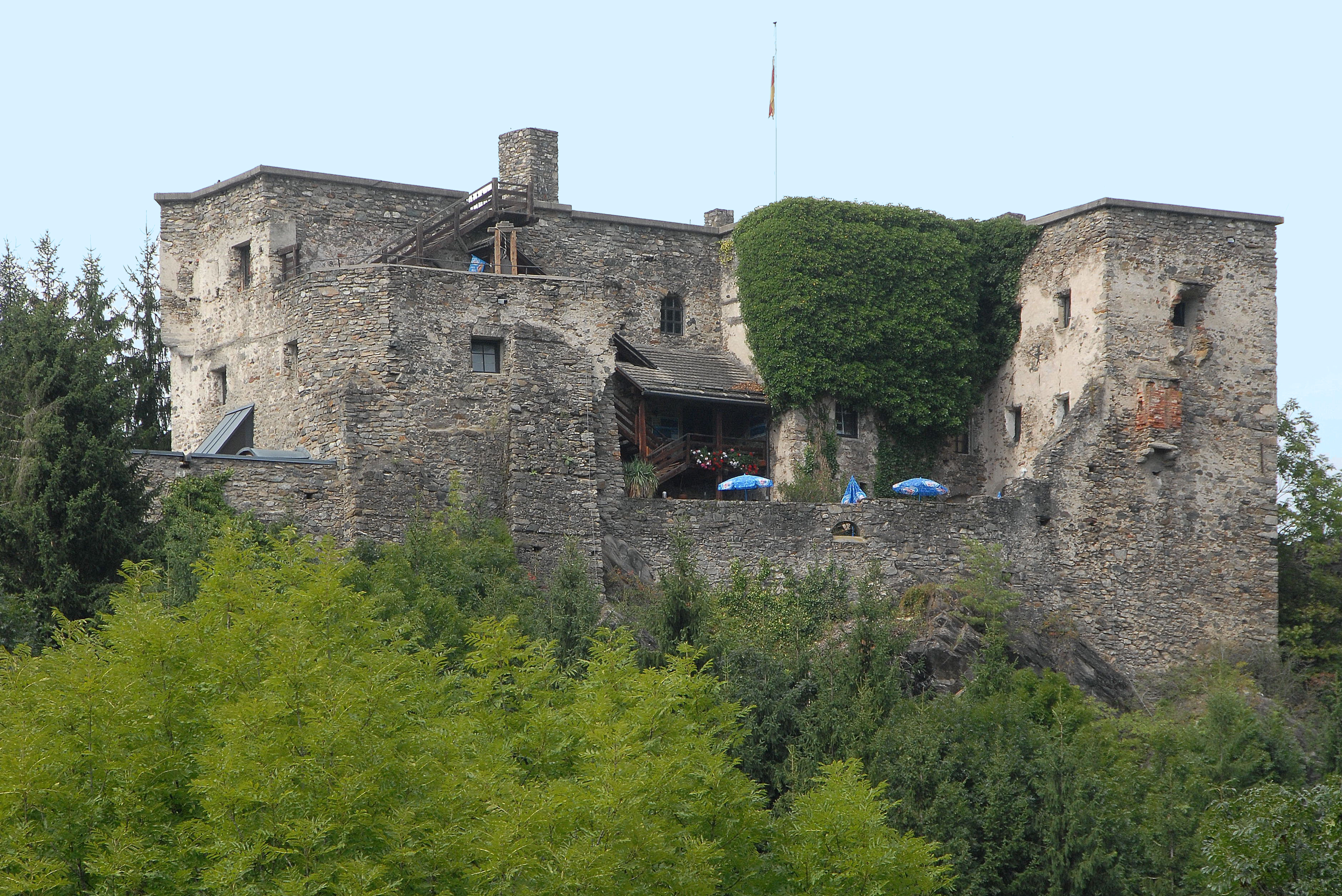
Sommeregg Castle, Treffling

Several prehistoric excavation finds denote a continuous settlement on the western bight of Millstätter See at least since the Neolithic. In the Hallstatt culture, Celtic tribes settled along the nearby Drava Valley, their kingdom Noricum became a Roman province under Emperor Augustus in 15 BC. The area was located near a Roman road (Via Iulia Augusta) from Aquileia to the local capital Teurnia, where a northern branch-off across the Radstädter Tauern Pass led to Iuvavum (present-day Salzburg). From the 6th century onwards Slavic tribes moved into the region, shown by numerous place names. Their Principality of Carantania became a Bavarian frontier march in the mid 8th century and part of the Frankish Empire under Charlemagne.

The local lords at Sommeregg Castle in the Duchy of Carinthia were first mentioned in an 1187 deed, they served as ministeriales (castellans) of the Counts of Ortenburg. In 1275 the castle was the site of the wedding of Countess Euphemia of Ortenburg with Count Albert I of Gorizia. When the Ortenburger family became extinct in 1418, their Carinthian possessions passed to the Counts of Celje, who left the rule to local nobles, among them Andreas von Graben. The House of Graben von Stein retained the estates when the Celje territories were inherited by the House of Habsburg, Carinthian dukes since 1335. Virgil von Graben had to face the devastation of Sommeregg Castle by the Hungarian forces of King Matthias Corvinus in 1487; the rebuilt fortress was inherited by his niece Rosina von Graben von Rain and in 1550 was purchased by the Khevenhüller noble family. In 1629 the Protestant Khevenhüller had to leave Carinthia at the instigation of Emperor Ferdinand II, and in 1651 the noble House of Lodron at Gmünd acquired their estates.

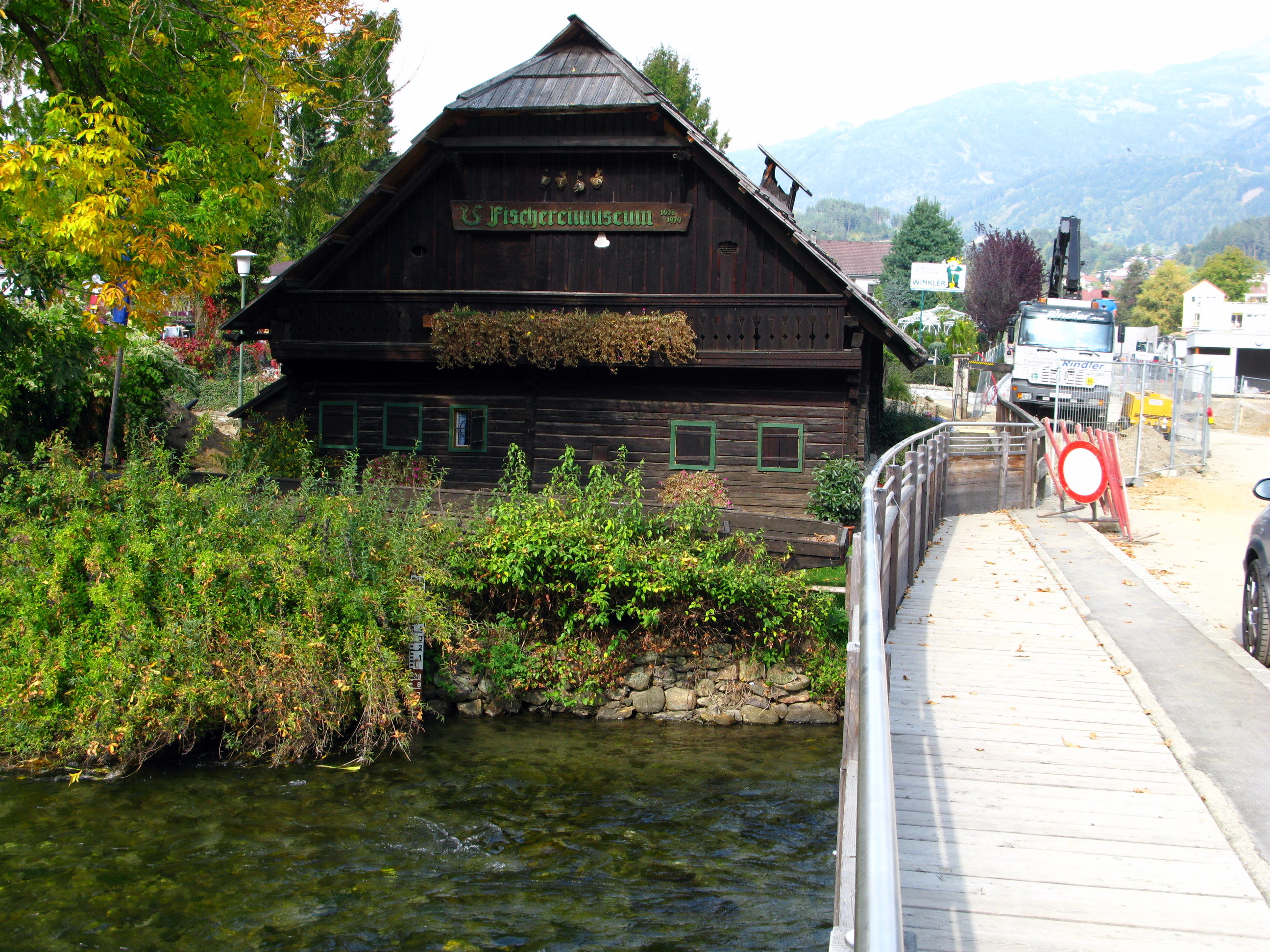
Old fisherman house near Lake Millstatt, today a museum

Up to the 1850 constitution of the present-day civil parishes, the places in Seeboden belonged to the lands of Sommeregg owned by the Lodron family. The municipalities of Seeboden and Treffling were united in 1870, whereas Lieserhofen, originally part of Spittal, stayed as a separate area from 1886 until 1973. Originally, most of the estates were rural with little industry or trade. In recent decades, the former swampy area at the lakeside has developed to a resort town and today tourism is the most important trade in Seeboden, which was elevated to the status of a market town in 2000.

From 1998 to 2010 the World Bodypainting Festival was held in Seeboden. From 2011 to 2016 it was held at Pörtschach at lake Wörthersee. The current venue is Klagenfurt, the state capital of Carinthia.

== Population ==
According to the 2001 census, Seeboden has 6,045 inhabitants, of which 91.4% are Austrian citizens, 1.9% are from Germany and 1.8% are from Bosnia and Herzegovina. 64.8% of the population are Catholics, 25.9% are Protestants and 2.2% are Muslims. 5.6% of the population do not subscribe to any religion.

== Culture and sights ==
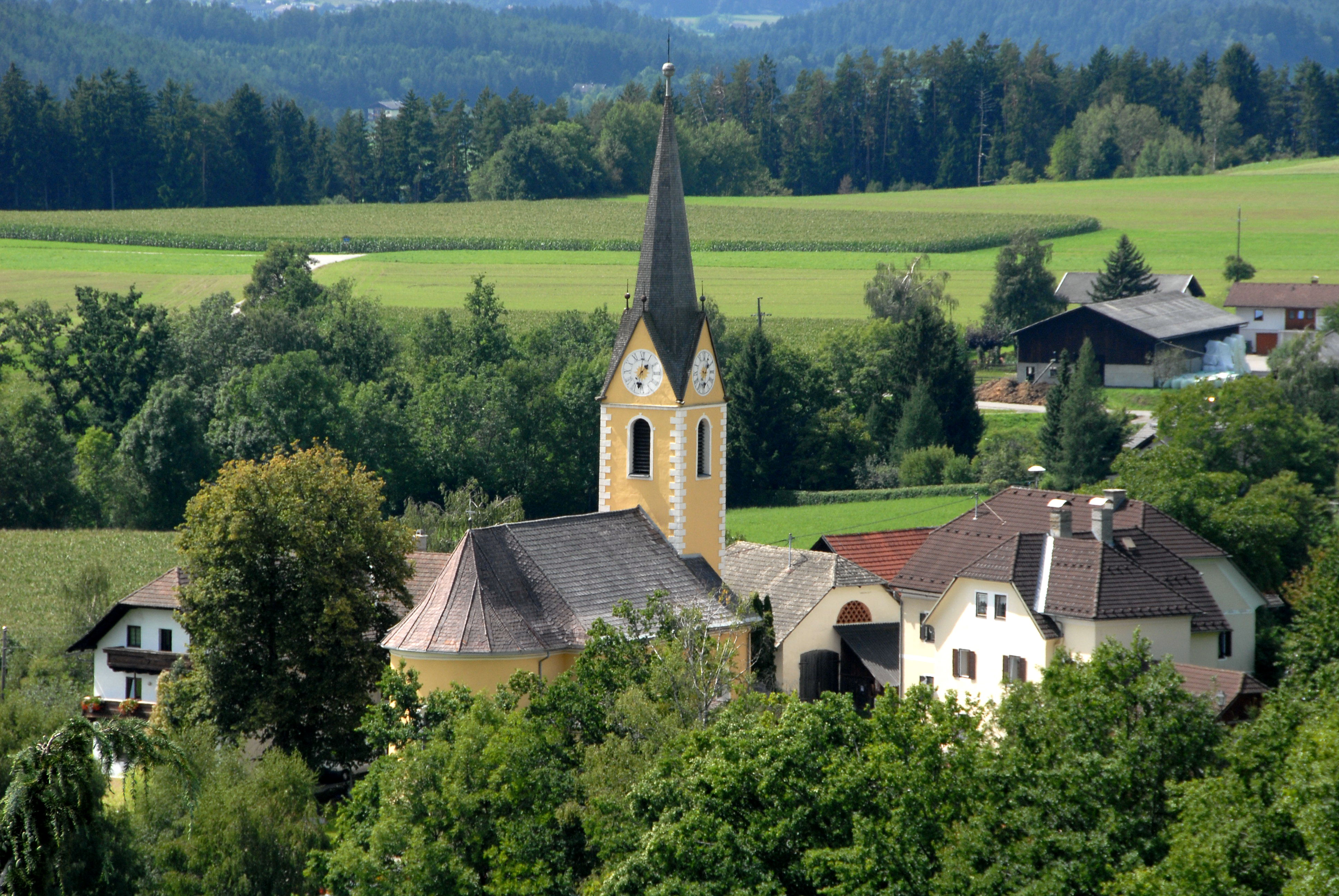
View from Sommeregg Castle to Unterhaus church

=== Buildings ===
- Burg Sommeregg - castle ruins with torture museum
- Protestant Tolerance church in Unterhaus, built in 1828

=== Museums ===
- Fishing museum (1. Kärntner Fischereimuseum)
- Bonsai museum

=== Regular events ===
- Knights' games at the Sommeregg Castle
- Spring concert in Seeboden chapel (on Saturday before Mothers' Day)
- Peter and Paul Festival in Wilsdorf on June 29

== Politics ==
=== Municipal assembly ===
Seats in the municipal assembly (Gemeinderat) as of 2009 local elections:

- 11 Austrian People's Party (ÖVP)
- 11 Freedom Party in Carinthia (FPK)
- 4 Social Democratic Party of Austria (SPÖ)
- 1 Freedom Party of Austria (FPÖ)

=== Coat of arms ===
The coat of arms binds Seeboden's location on the Millstätter See shore (blue background and gold mermaid) with the local government history (red and silver shield of the Counts of Ortenburg). It was given to the municipality on April 30, 1970 by the Carinthian state administration. The description states:

A gold mermaid on a blue shield, carrying a red shield in her arms, which contains a red wing on a silver background between two silver wings on a red background.

The town flag is red, blue and yellow with its own coat of arms.

== Notable people ==
- Herbert Haupt (born 1947), politician
- Thomas Morgenstern (born 1986), ski jumper

The politician Eva Glawischnig-Piesczek (born 1969) grew up in Seeboden.

== Gallery ==
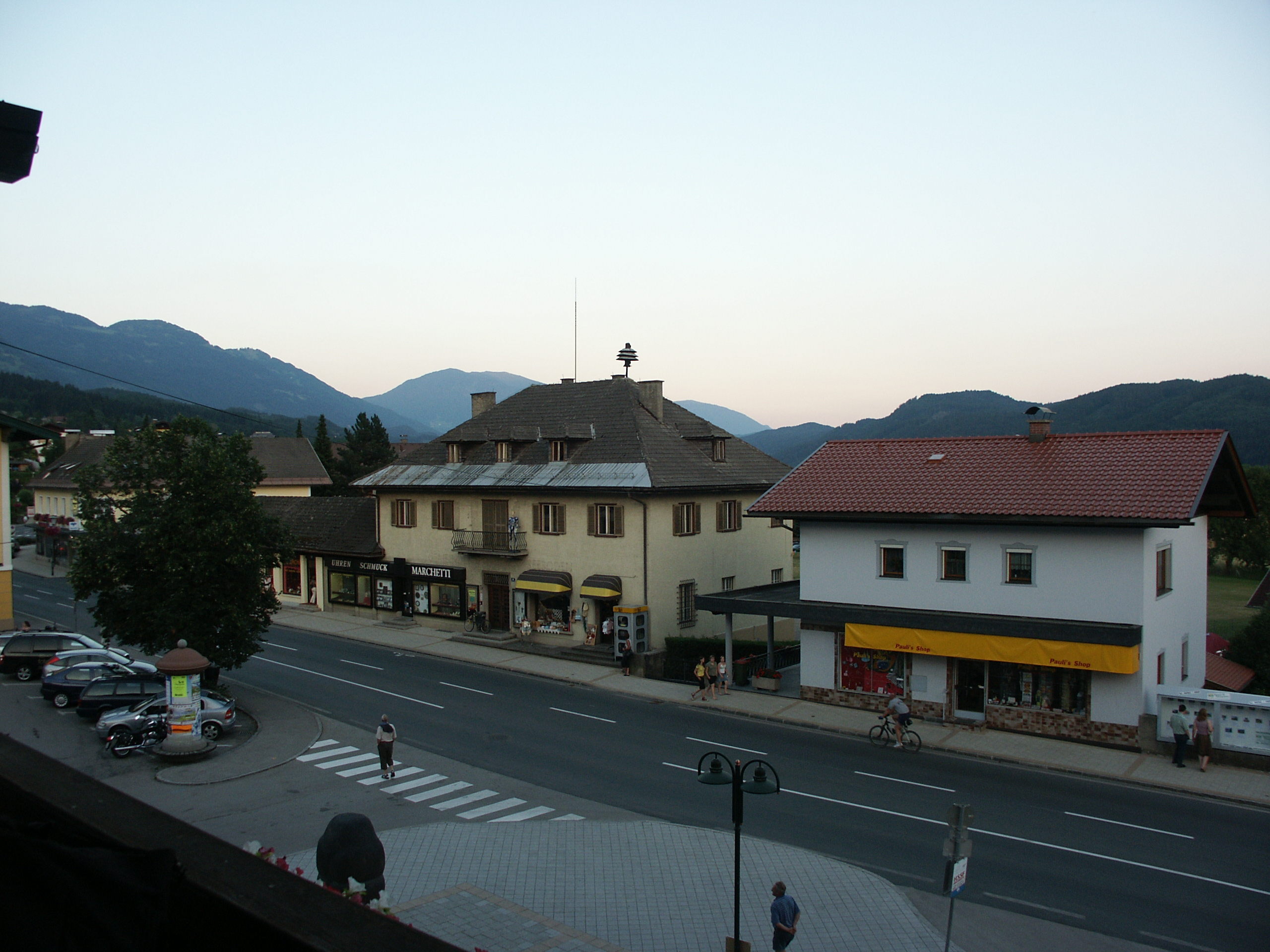
Hauptstraße, the main road of Seeboden

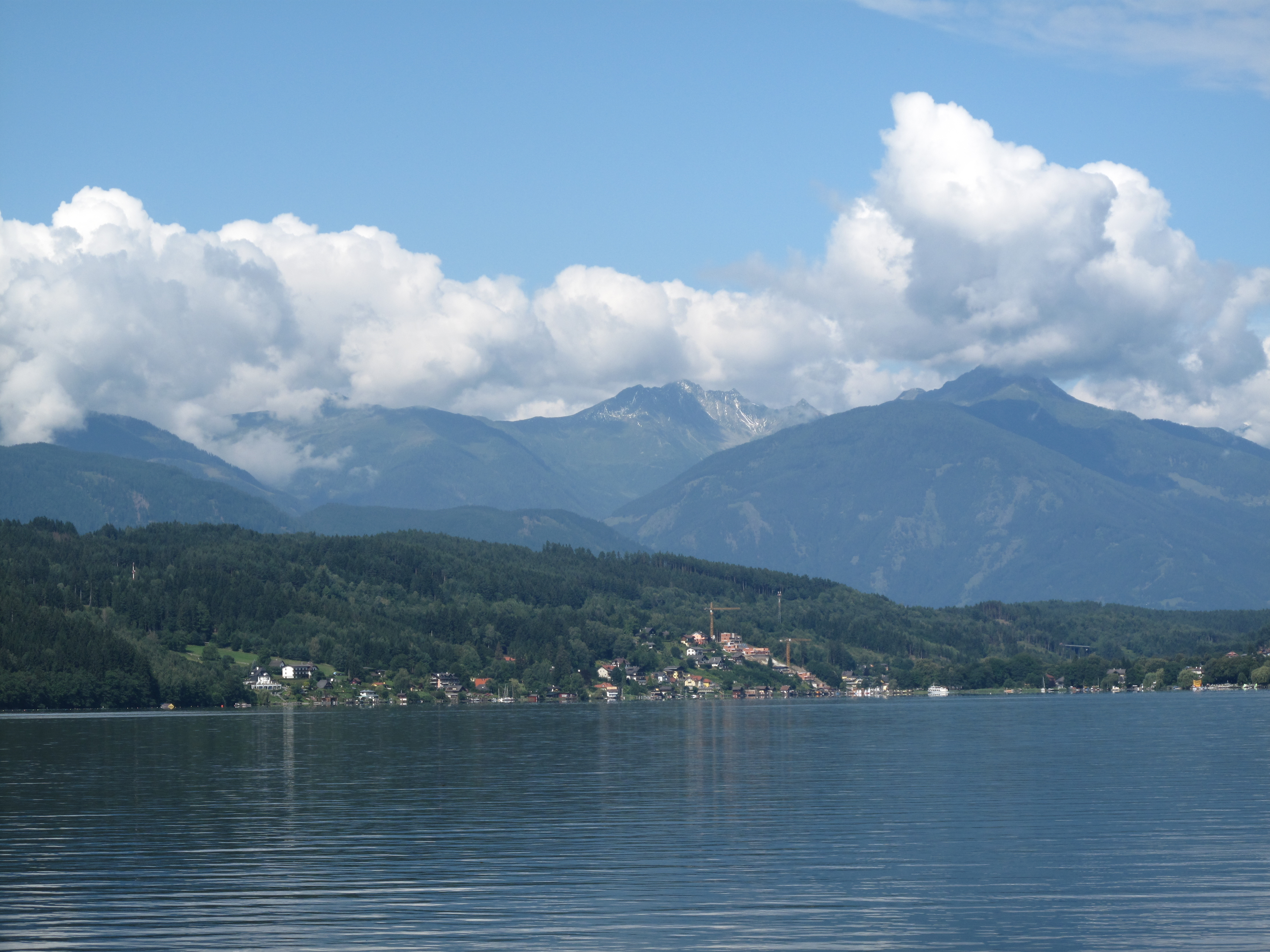
View to the village (southern part)

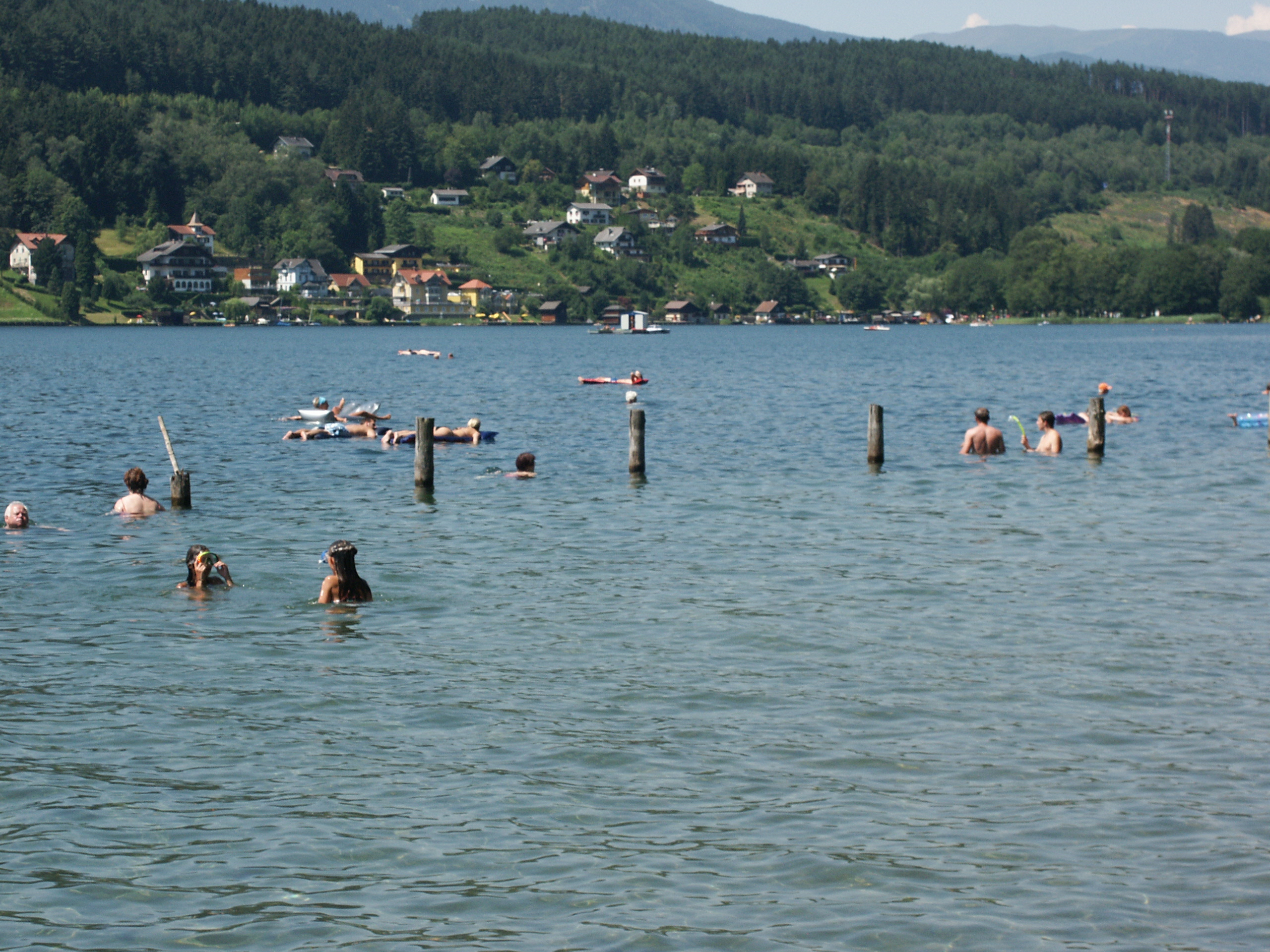
People swimming in the Millstätter See

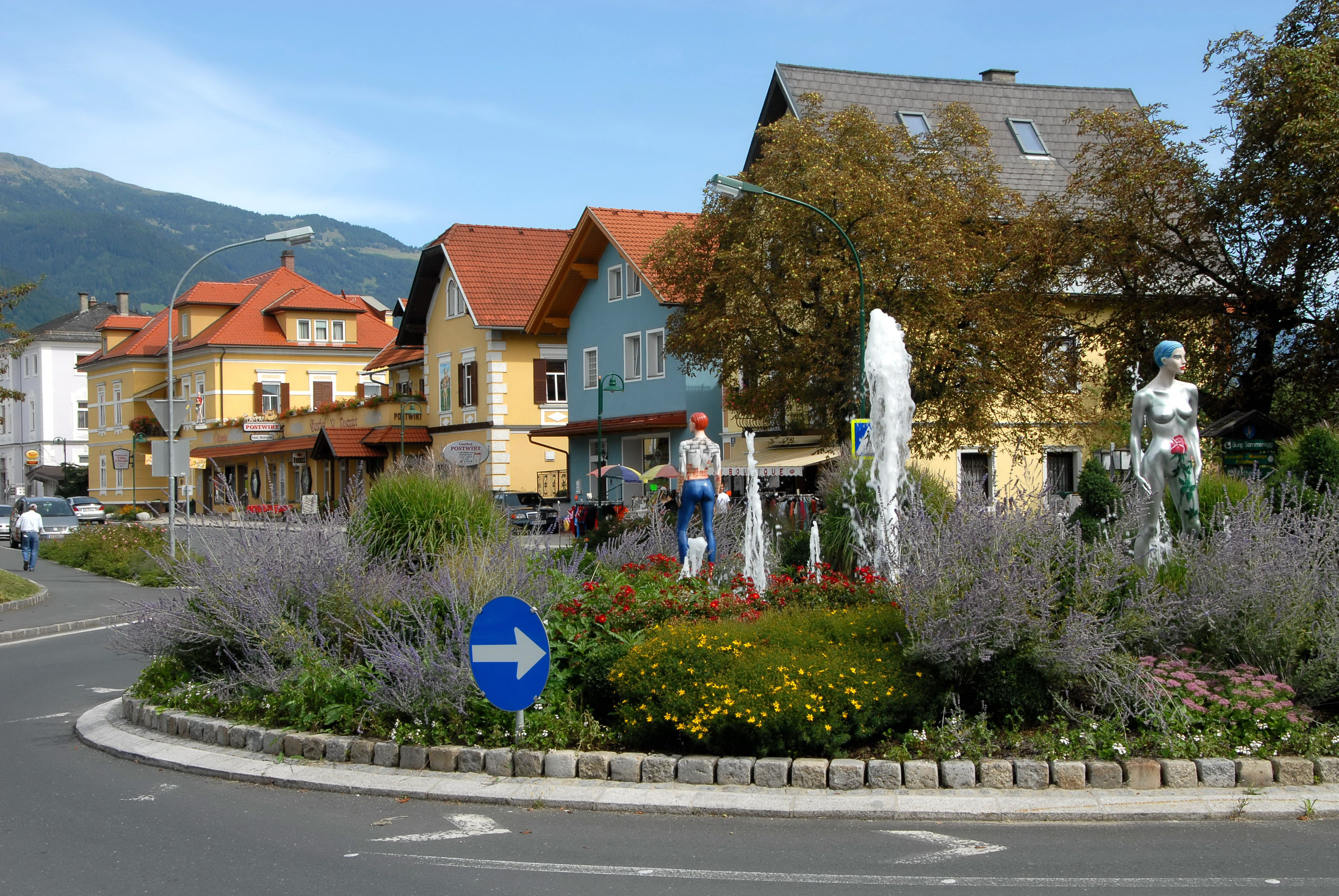
Roundabout at the entrance of Seeboden

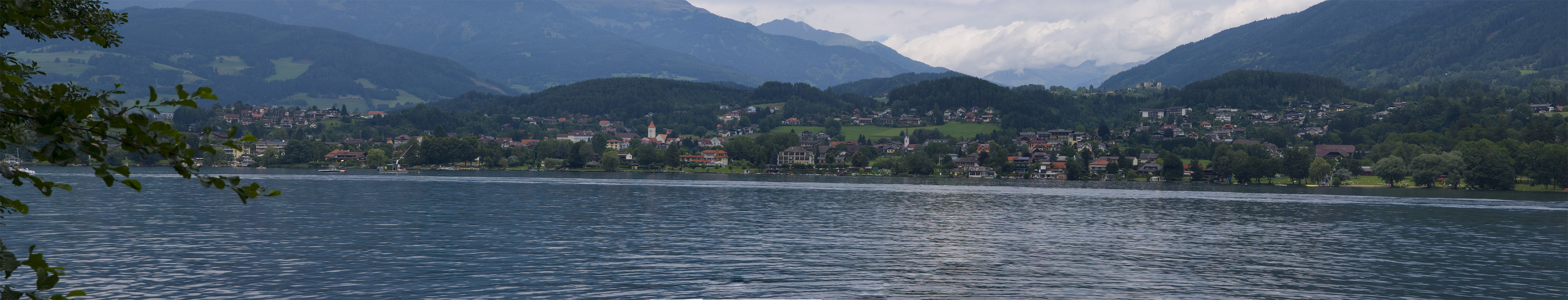

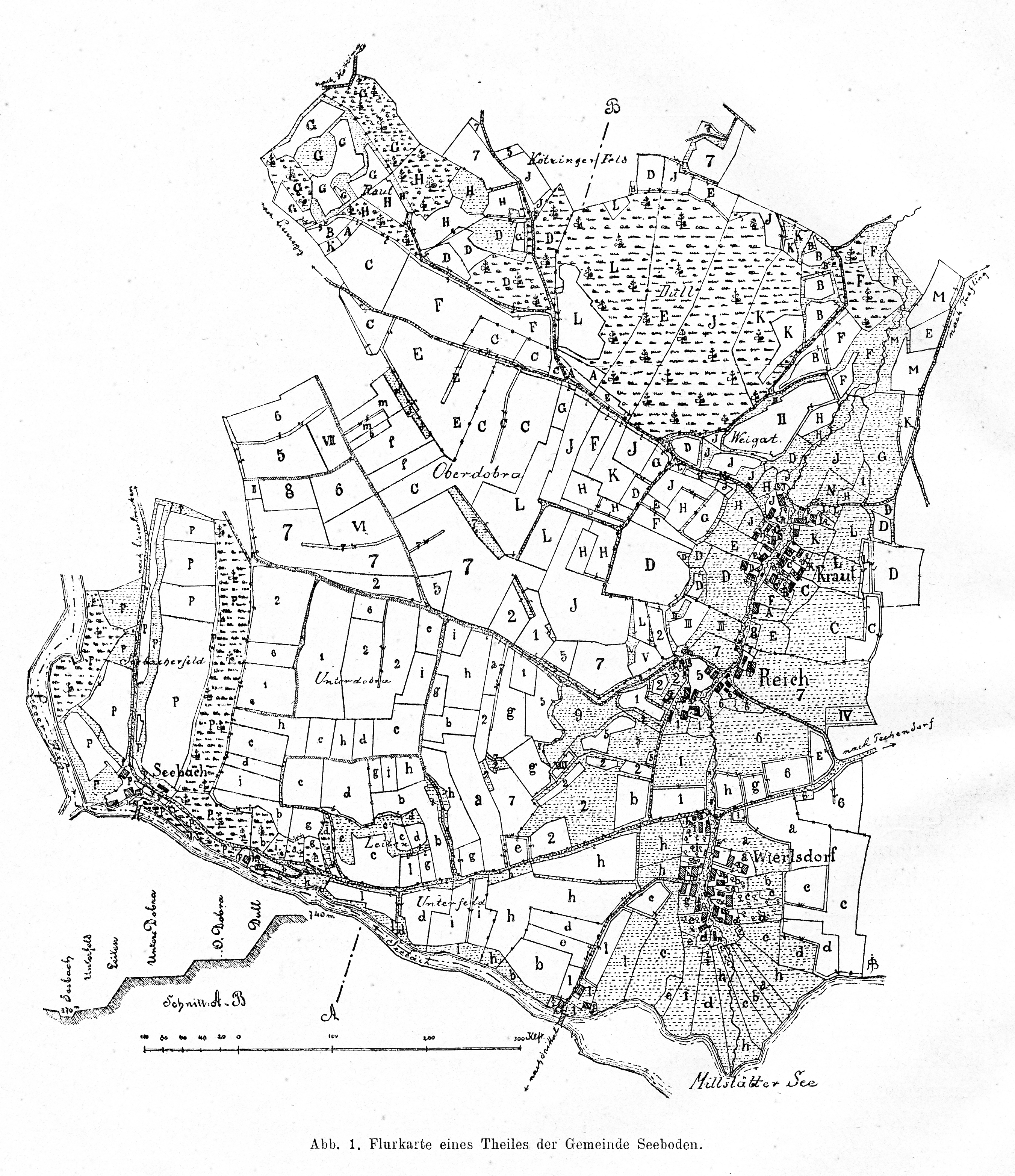
Map of the land part of the community
