= Marco Giustiniani (bishop of Torcello) =

Most Reverend Marco Giustiniani
- Bishop of Torcello
- Church: Catholic Church
- Diocese: Diocese of Torcello
- In office: 1692–1735
- Predecessor: Giacomo Vianoli
- Successor: Vincenzo Maria Diedo

Orders
- Consecration: 30 March 1692

Personal details
- Born: 12 February 1655 Venice, Republic of Venice
- Died: 2 March 1735 (age 80) Torcello, Republic of Venice

Marco Giustiniani (1655–1735) was an Italian Roman Catholic prelate who served as Bishop of Torcello (1692–1735).

== Biography ==
Marco Giustiniani was born in Venice, Republic of Venice on 12 February 1655. He was ordained a deacon on 20 January 1692 and a priest on 27 January 1692. On 24 March 1692, he was appointed during the papacy of Pope Innocent XII as Bishop of Torcello. On 30 March 1692, he was consecrated bishop. He served as Bishop of Torcello until his death on 2 March 1735. While bishop, he was the principal co-consecrator of Francesco Andrea Grassi, Bishop of Caorle (1700) and Pietro Barbarigo, Patriarch of Venice (1706).

== External links and additional sources ==
- Cheney, David M. "Diocese of Torcello (Turris)". Catholic-Hierarchy.org. (for Chronology of Bishops) ^{[self-published]}
- Chow, Gabriel. "Titular Episcopal See of Torcello (Italy)". GCatholic.org. (for Chronology of Bishops) ^{[self-published]}

Catholic Church titles
Preceded by Giacomo Vianoli	Bishop of Torcello; 1692–1735	Succeeded by Vincenzo Maria Diedo
