= Francesco Andrea Grassi =

18th-century Italian Catholic bishop

Most Reverend Francesco Andrea Grassi
- Bishop of Caorle
- Church: Catholic Church
- Diocese: Diocese of Caorle
- In office: 1700–1712
- Predecessor: Domenico Minio
- Successor: Daniele Sansoni

Orders
- Consecration: 9 May 1700 by Daniello Marco Delfino

Personal details
- Born: 19 May 1661 Chioggia, Italy
- Died: January 1712 (age 50) Caorle, Italy

Francesco Andrea Grassi (1661–1712) was a Roman Catholic prelate who served as Bishop of Caorle (1700–1712).

== Biography ==
Francesco Andrea Grassi was born in Chioggia, Italy on 19 May 1661. On 30 March 1700, he was appointed during the papacy of Pope Innocent XII as Bishop of Caorle. On 9 May 1700, he was consecrated bishop by Daniello Marco Delfino, Bishop of Brescia, with Prospero Bottini, Titular Archbishop of Myra, and Marco Giustiniani, Bishop of Torcello, serving as co-consecrators. He served as Bishop of Caorle until his death in January 1712.

Catholic Church titles
Preceded by Domenico Minio	Bishop of Caorle; 1700–1712	Succeeded by Daniele Sansoni
