= Egidio Falcetta de Cingulo =

Most Reverend Egidio Falcetta de Cingulo
- Bishop of Bertinoro
- Church: Catholic Church
- Diocese: Diocese of Bertinoro
- In office: 1563–1564
- Predecessor: Luigi Vannini de Theodoli
- Successor: Agostino Folignatti
- Previous post: Bishop of Bertinoro (1542–1563)

Personal details
- Died: 1564

Egidio Falcetta de Cingulo (died 1564) was a Roman Catholic prelate who served as Bishop of Bertinoro (1542–1564) and Bishop of Caorle (1538–1542).

== Biography ==
On 15 March 1542, Sebastiano Rossi was appointed during the papacy of Pope Paul III as Bishop of Caorle. On 30 January 1563, he was appointed during the papacy of Pope Pius IV as Bishop of Bertinoro. He served as Bishop of Bertinoro until his death in 1564.

== External links and additional sources ==
- Cheney, David M. "Diocese of Caorle". Catholic-Hierarchy.org. (for Chronology of Bishops) ^{[self-published]}
- Chow, Gabriel. "Titular Episcopal See of Caorle (Italy)". GCatholic.org. (for Chronology of Bishops) ^{[self-published]}
- Cheney, David M. "Diocese of Bertinoro". Catholic-Hierarchy.org. (for Chronology of Bishops) ^{[self-published]}
- Chow, Gabriel. "Diocese of Bertinoro (Italy)". GCatholic.org. (for Chronology of Bishops) ^{[self-published]}

Catholic Church titles
Preceded by Sebastiano Rossi (bishop)	Bishop of Caorle; 1563–1564	Succeeded by Giulio Soperchio
Preceded by Luigi Vannini de Theodoli	Bishop of Bertinoro; 1542–1564	Succeeded by Agostino Folignatti
