= Domenico Minio =

Roman Catholic prelate

Most Reverend Domenico Minio
- Bishop of Caorle
- Church: Catholic Church
- Diocese: Diocese of Caorle
- In office: 1684–1698
- Predecessor: Francesco Antonio Boscaroli
- Successor: Francesco Andrea Grassi

Orders
- Consecration: 1 May 1684 by Alessandro Crescenzi (cardinal)

Personal details
- Born: 6 March 1628 Burano, Italy
- Died: 5 June 1698 (age 70) Caorle, Italy

Domenico Minio (6 March, 1628 – 5 June, 1698) was a Roman Catholic prelate who served as Bishop of Caorle (1684–1698).

== Biography ==
Domenico Minio was born in Burano, Italy on 6 March 1628. On 24 April 1684, he was appointed during the papacy of Pope Innocent XI as Bishop of Caorle. On 1 May 1684, he was consecrated bishop by Alessandro Crescenzi (cardinal), Cardinal-Priest of Santa Prisca, with Francesco Maria Giannotti, Bishop of Segni, and Francesco Onofrio Hodierna, Bishop of Bitetto, serving as co-consecrators. He served as Bishop of Caorle until his death on 5 June 1698.

Catholic Church titles
Preceded by Francesco Antonio Boscaroli	Bishop of Caorle; 1684–1698	Succeeded by Francesco Andrea Grassi
