= Daniel Rossi (bishop) =

Most Reverend Daniel Rossi
- Bishop of Caorle
- Church: Catholic Church
- Diocese: Diocese of Caorle
- In office: 1513–1538
- Predecessor: Pietro Carlo
- Successor: Sebastiano Rossi (bishop)

Personal details
- Died: 1538 Caorle, Italy

Daniel Rossi (died 1538) was a Roman Catholic prelate who served as Bishop of Caorle (1513–1538).

== Biography ==
On 9 May 1513, Daniel Rossi was appointed during the papacy of Pope Leo X as Bishop of Caorle. He served as Bishop of Caorle until his death in 1538.

== External links and additional sources ==
- Cheney, David M. "Diocese of Caorle". Catholic-Hierarchy.org. (for Chronology of Bishops)^{self-published}
- Chow, Gabriel. "Titular Episcopal See of Caorle (Italy)". GCatholic.org. (for Chronology of Bishops)^{self-published}

Catholic Church titles
| Preceded by Pietro Carlo | Bishop of Caorle; 1513–1538 | Succeeded by Sebastiano Rossi (bishop) |
