= Sebastiano Rossi (bishop) =

Most Reverend Sebastiano Rossi
- Bishop of Caorle
- Church: Catholic Church
- Diocese: Diocese of Caorle
- In office: 1538–1542
- Predecessor: Daniel Rossi (bishop)
- Successor: Egidio Falcetta de Cingulo

Personal details
- Died: 1542

Sebastiano Rossi (died 1542) was a Roman Catholic prelate who served as Bishop of Caorle (1538–1542).

== Biography ==
On 30 October 1538, Sebastiano Rossi was appointed during the papacy of Pope Paul III as Bishop of Caorle. He served as Bishop of Caorle until his death in 1542.

== External links and additional sources ==
- Cheney, David M. "Diocese of Caorle". Catholic-Hierarchy.org. (for Chronology of Bishops) ^{[self-published]}
- Chow, Gabriel. "Titular Episcopal See of Caorle (Italy)". GCatholic.org. (for Chronology of Bishops) ^{[self-published]}

Catholic Church titles
Preceded by Daniel Rossi (bishop)	Bishop of Caorle; 1538–1542	Succeeded by Egidio Falcetta de Cingulo
