= Pietro Carlo =

Most Reverend Pietro Carlo
- Bishop of Caorle
- Church: Catholic Church
- Diocese: Diocese of Caorle
- In office: 1470–1513
- Successor: Daniel Rossi (bishop)

Pietro Carlo was a Roman Catholic prelate who served as Bishop of Caorle (1470–1513).

== Biography ==
On 12 July 1470, Pietro Carlo was appointed during the papacy of Pope Paul II as Bishop of Caorle. He served as Bishop of Caorle until his resignation in 1513.

== See also ==
- Catholic Church in Italy

== External links and additional sources ==
- Cheney, David M. "Diocese of Caorle". Catholic-Hierarchy.org. (for Chronology of Bishops)^{self-published}
- Chow, Gabriel. "Titular Episcopal See of Caorle (Italy)". GCatholic.org. (for Chronology of Bishops)^{self-published}

Catholic Church titles
Preceded by	Bishop of Caorle; 1470–1513	Succeeded by Daniel Rossi (bishop)
