= Nikolsdorf =

Municipality in Tyrol, Austria

- Municipality
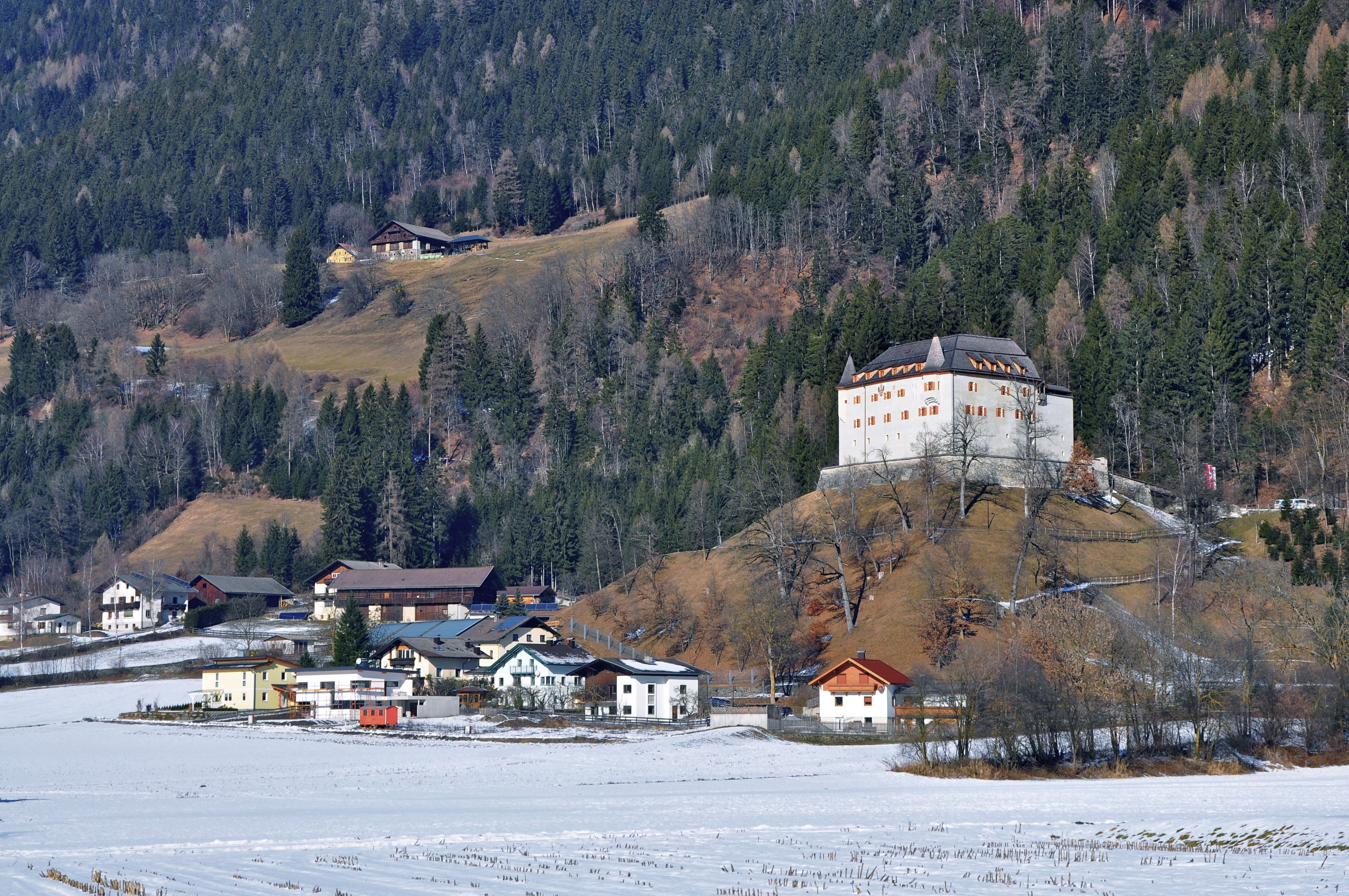
- Lengberg Castle

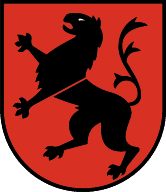
- Coat of arms

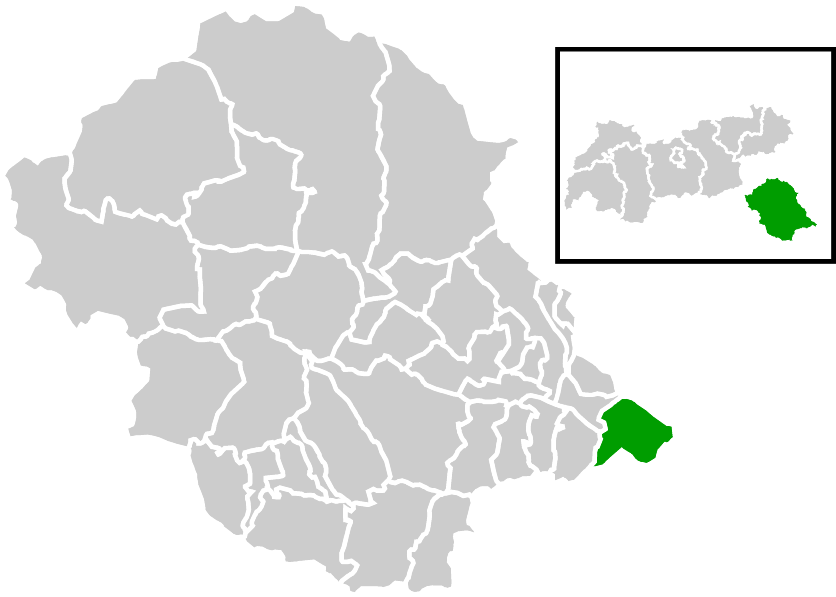
- Location within Lienz district

- Location within Austria
- Coordinates: 46°47′06″N 12°54′21″E
- Country: Austria
- State: Tyrol
- District: Lienz

Government
  - Mayor: Georg Rainer (ÖVP)

Area
  - Total: 33.59 km^{2} (12.97 sq mi)
- Elevation: 888 m (2,913 ft)

Population (2018-01-01)
  - Total: 894
  - Density: 26.6/km^{2} (68.9/sq mi)
- Time zone: UTC+1 (CET)
  - Summer (DST): UTC+2 (CEST)
- Postal code: 9782
- Area code: 04858
- Vehicle registration: LZ
- Website: www.nikolsdorf.at

Nikolsdorf is a municipality in the district of Lienz in the Austrian state of Tyrol.

== Population ==
Historical population
Year	Pop.	±%
1869	789	—
1880	783	−0.8%
1890	766	−2.2%
1900	679	−11.4%
1910	654	−3.7%
1923	692	+5.8%
1934	795	+14.9%
1939	782	−1.6%
1951	838	+7.2%
1961	798	−4.8%
1971	905	+13.4%
1981	891	−1.5%
2001	863	−3.1%
2012	910	+5.4%
