= Kornberg bei Riegersburg =

- Former municipality
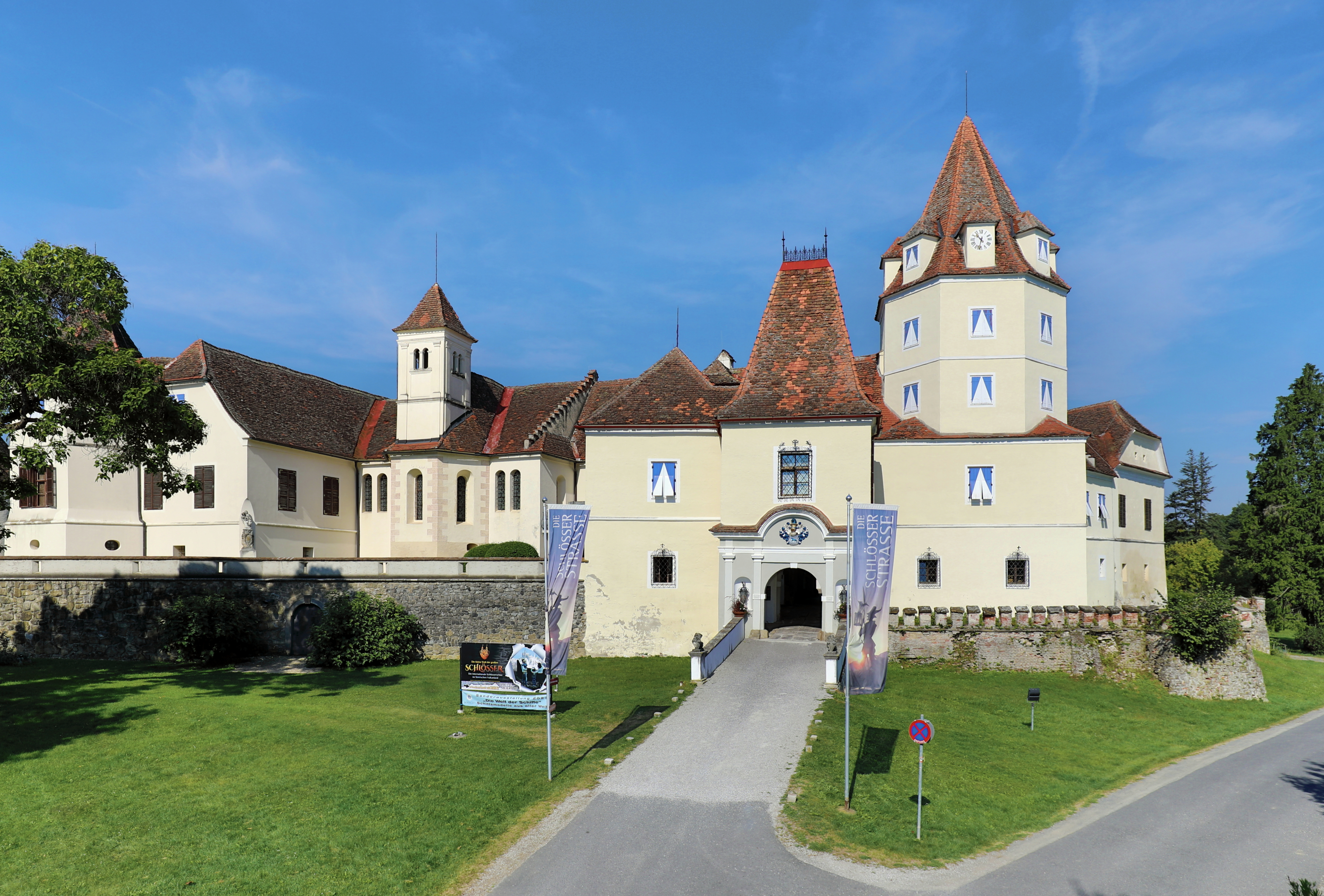
- Southeast view of Kornberg Castle

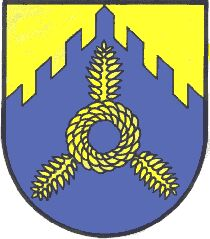
- Coat of arms

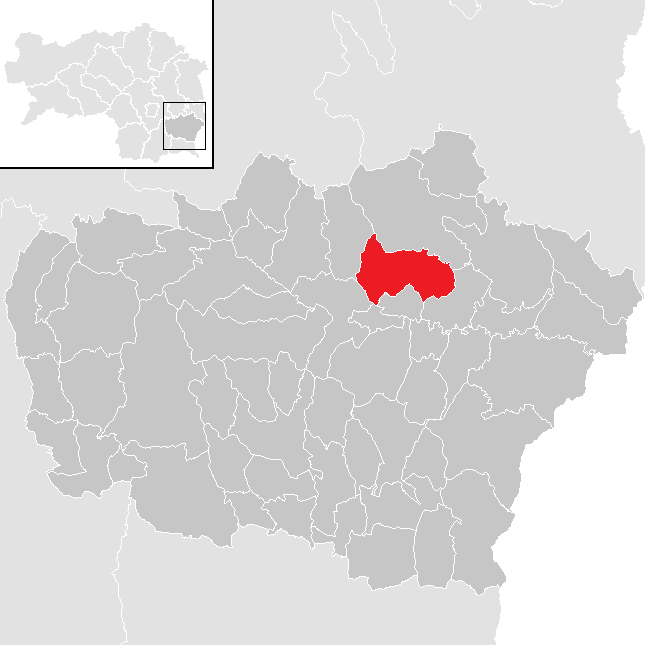
- Location within Südoststeiermark district

- Location within Austria
- Coordinates: 46°59′N 15°55′E
- Country: Austria
- State: Styria
- District: Südoststeiermark

Area
  - Total: 15.97 km^{2} (6.17 sq mi)
- Elevation: 360 m (1,180 ft)

Population (1 January 2016)
  - Total: 1,145
  - Density: 71.70/km^{2} (185.7/sq mi)
- Time zone: UTC+1 (CET)
  - Summer (DST): UTC+2 (CEST)
- Postal code: 8330
- Area code: +43 3153
- Vehicle registration: FB
- Website: www.kornberg-riegersburg. steiermark.at

Kornberg bei Riegersburg is a former municipality in the district of Südoststeiermark in the Austrian state of Styria. Since the 2015 Styria municipal structural reform, it is part of the municipality Riegersburg. Kornberg Castle is located on a hill above the village

== Population ==
Historical population
Year	Pop.	±%
1869	1,295	—
1880	1,336	+3.2%
1890	1,280	−4.2%
1900	1,309	+2.3%
1910	1,362	+4.0%
1923	1,307	−4.0%
1934	1,310	+0.2%
1939	1,225	−6.5%
1951	1,328	+8.4%
1961	1,184	−10.8%
1971	1,227	+3.6%
1981	1,215	−1.0%
1991	1,199	−1.3%
2001	1,160	−3.3%
2013	1,126	−2.9%
