= Carl-Alexander Graubner =

German civil engineer

Carl-Alexander Graubner (born 1957) is a German civil engineer and since 1996 professor at the TU Darmstadt. Since 2007 he has been a member of the University Assembly TU Darmstadt and since 2012 chairman of the mirror committee "masonry" in the DIN.

== Biography ==
Carl-Alexander Graubner studied civil engineering at the Technical University of Munich from 1977 to 1981 with a specialization in structural engineering. He then worked from 1982 to 1988 as a research assistant at the Institute of Concrete Structures, Technical University of Munich and received his doctorate there in 1989. From 1989 to 1994 his activities were in the construction industry, and he worked as division head of the Philipp Holzmann / Held & Francke Bau Inc. in Munich. During this time he was involved in planning a number of major construction projects of high building, industrial and bridge constructions. He designed, among other projects, a long integral prestressed concrete bridge over the Rhine-Main-Danube Canal in Berching Bavaria, which attracted worldwide. Furthermore, he and his planning team were also responsible for the structural design of the ethylene factory of company BASF in Antwerp. From 1994 to 1996 he ran his own engineering office in Munich and made e.g. the design and the cost estimation for the new board Transrapid route from Hamburg to Berlin. Since 2001 Graubner is a shareholder and member of the management of KHP König und Heunisch Planungsgesellschaft mbH in Frankfurt. Working as an approved checking engineer he accompanied over the past years a number of major projects such as the shopping center MyZeil, or the new construction of the European Central Bank in Frankfurt. In 2009, he founded with partners the Life Cycle Engineering Experts GmbH, which focuses on sustainable construction consultancy services.

In 1996, Graubner was appointed as a full professor at the Institute of Concrete Structures at the Technische Universität Darmstadt. He is currently managing director of the Institute of Concrete Structures and since 2007 a member of the University Assembly. He was in the leading group of development of German Certificate for Sustainable Building band consulted various federal and state ministries in questions of sustainability for many years. Graubner is chairman of the standardisation committee NA 005-06-01 "masonry" in DIN and member of several expert committees of the German Institute for Building Technology. In addition, he represents German interests in European standardisation committees in the field of masonry construction. Graubner is co-editor of the book series "masonry aktuell" and member of the Editorial Board of the journal "masonry".

== Scientific publications ==
- together with R. Rast, K.-J. Schneider (Hrsg.): Mauerwerksbau aktuell 2014 – Praxishandbuch für Architekten und Ingenieure. Bauwerk. Beuth Verlag, Berlin 2014
- together with M. Schmitt: Kalksandstein – Statikhandbuch 3. Auflage. Bundesverband Kalksandsteinindustrie e.V., Hannover [Hrsg.], Verlag Bau+Technik GmbH, Hannover 2014
- together with M. Schmitt: Bemessung nach Eurocode 6 In: Kalksandstein: Planungshandbuch. Planung, Konstruktion, Ausführung (PKA), 6. Auflage. Bundesverband Kalksandsteinindustrie e.V., Hannover (Hrsg.), Verlag Bau+Technik GmbH, Hannover 2014
- together with C. Alfes, W. Brameshuber, W. Jäger, W. Seim: Der Eurocode 6 für Deutschland – Kommentierte Fassung. Deutsche Gesellschaft für Mauerwerks- und Wohnungsbau e.V., Arbeitsgemeinschaft für zeitgemäßes Bauen e.V., Zentralverband Deutsches Baugewerbe, Bundesvereinigung der Prüfingenieure für Bautechnik e.V., Verband Beratender Ingenieure (VBI, Hrsg.) Beuth Verlag, Berlin, Verlag Ernst & Sohn, Berlin 2013
- together with W. Rossner: Spannbetonbauwerke. Teil 4: Bemessungsbeispiele nach Eurocode 2. Ernst & Sohn Verlag, Munich 2012
- together with K. Hüske: Nachhaltigkeit im Bauwesen: Grundlagen – Instrumente – Beispiele. Ernst & Sohn Verlag, 2003
- together with M. Six, J. Zeier: Beitrag Spannbetonbau. In: Jahrbuch Stahlbetonbau aktuell 2015. Beuth Verlag GmbH, Berlin 2015
- together with J. Kohoutek, N. L. Tran: Bemessungsrelevante Einwirkungskombinationen im Hochbau. In: Beton- und Stahlbetonbau 109 (2014), Heft 9. Verlag Ernst & Sohn, Berlin, 2014
- together with M.Schmitt, V. Förster: Bemessung von Mauerwerk nach EC 6 – einfach und praxisnah. In: Mauerwerk Heft 5 2013, Verlag Ernst & Sohn, Berlin, 9/2013
- together with T. Proske, S. Hainer, M. Rezvani: Eco-Friendly Concretes with Reduced Water and Cement Contents – Mix Design Principles and Laboratory Tests. Cement and Concrete Research. Ausgabe 51, September 2013, S. 38–46
- together with E. Boska, C. Motzko, T. Proske: Formwork pressure induced by highly flowable concrete – Design approach and transfer in practice. In: Structural Concrete, Journal of the fib. Ernst & Sohn Verlag, 1/2012, S. 51–60
- together with C. Schneider; S. Pohl, A. Wronna: Beyond Platin – Nachhaltigkeitstrends in der Bau- und Immobilienwirtschaft. In: Mauerwerk Heft 5 2012, Ernst & Sohn Verlag, Berlin, 10/2012
- together with T. Mielecke: Nachhaltige Ingenieurbauwerke. In: Bauingenieur, Band 87, Heft 4 2012, S. 156–164, Springer-VDI-Verlag GmbH & Co. KG, Düsseldorf 2012
- together with H. Garrecht, T. Proske, S. Hainer, M. Jakob: Stahlbetonbauteile aus klima- und ressourcenschonendem Ökobeton – Technische Innovation zur Realisierung nachhaltiger Betonbauwerke. In: Beton- und Stahlbetonbau. Ernst & Sohn Verlag, Heft 6, 2012. S. 401–413
- together with A. Knauff, E. Pelke: Lebenszyklusbetrachtungen als Grundlage für die Nachhaltigkeitsbewertung von Straßenbrücken. In: Stahlbau, Band 80, Heft 3, Ernst & Sohn Verlag, Berlin 2011
- together with A. Knauff, U. Baumgärtner, O. Fischer, P. Haardt, A. Putz: Nachhaltigkeitsbewertung für die Verkehrsinfrastruktur. In: Bauingenieur, Band 85 (2010), Heft 7/8, Springer VDI Verlag, Düsseldorf, 2010
