= Andreas von Graben =

Carinthian knight and nobleman

- Burgrave of Sommeregg
- Reign: 1442–1463
- Predecessor: Jörg von Hallegg
- Successor: Virgil von Graben
- Born: 15th century Kornberg Castle, Styria
- Died: 12 July 1463; Sommeregg Castle, Carinthia
- Buried: St Leonard's Church, Treffling
- Noble family: House of Graben von Stein
- Spouse: Barbara Hallecker
- Issue: eight children, oa Virgil von Graben
- Father: Friedrich I von Graben
- Mother: Katharina von Sommeregg

Andreas von Graben zu Sommeregg (also Andreas vom Graben; 15th century – 12 July 1463) was a Carinthian knight and nobleman residing at Sommeregg Castle. He served as a burgrave and castellan governor in the Ortenburg estates, held by the Counts of Celje until 1456. With the extinction of the Cillier family, Von Graben lost the post of captain of the County of Ortenburg under the Habsburgs, their successors as Ortenburg sovereign.

== Life ==
=== Origin ===
Born at Kornberg Castle in the Duchy of Styria, Andreas von Graben was a descendant of the noble (edelfrei) House of Graben family. He was the son of Friedrich I von Graben (d. 1422 at Kornberg Castle) and Katharina von Sumerau (Saurau); Burgrave Friedrich II von Graben was a brother of him. Andreas' nephew Ulrich III von Graben became a confidant of the Habsburg emperor Frederick III. Andreas` sister (?) Veronica von Graben (d. 1467) was married to Philipp Breuner (d. 1458), and Elisabeth von Graben married with Georg von Auersperg (d. 1488).

=== Marriage and issue ===
Andreas von Graben married Barbara von Hallegg, daughter of Jörg von Hallegg (Hallecker), imperial counsellor and Landeshauptmann of the Duchy of Carinthia. The couple had at least eight children

- Heinrich von Graben (d. 1507)
- Ernst von Graben (d. 1513), nobleman, served the Archbishops of Salzburg
- Virgil von Graben (1430/1440-1507), succeeded his father as Burgrave of Sommeregg, administrator in the County of Gorizia, served the Habsburg emperors Frederick III and Maximilian I
- Ruth von Graben
- Cosmas von Graben (d. 1479), nobleman, Burgrave of Sanneck (Žovnek), served the Counts of Celje and the House of Habsburg
- Wolfgang von Graben, priest
- Wolfgang Andreas von Graben, knighted by King Maximilian I in 1486 at his coronation in Aachen
- Barbara von Graben, married to Ladislaus Prager

=== Coat of arms ===
Originally, the family of Andreas von Graben of Kornberg carried the coat of arms with the shovel (silver shovel on red), but adopted the oblique beam coat of arms (red, split by blue and silver) in Ortenburg services.

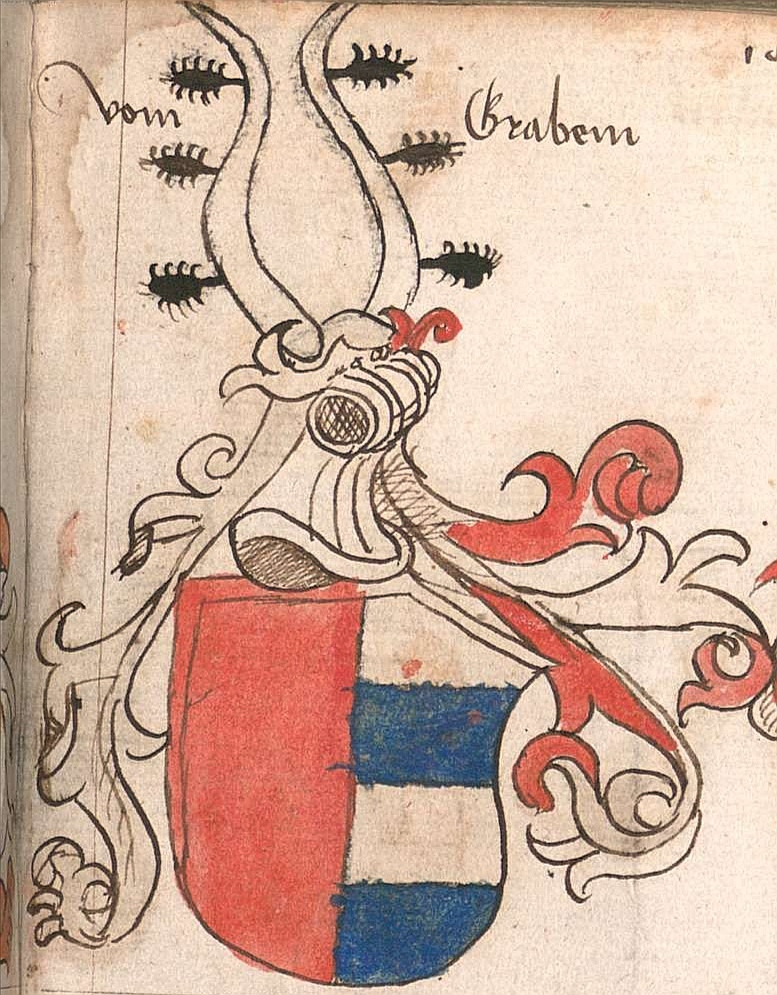
Coat of arms Andreas von Graben

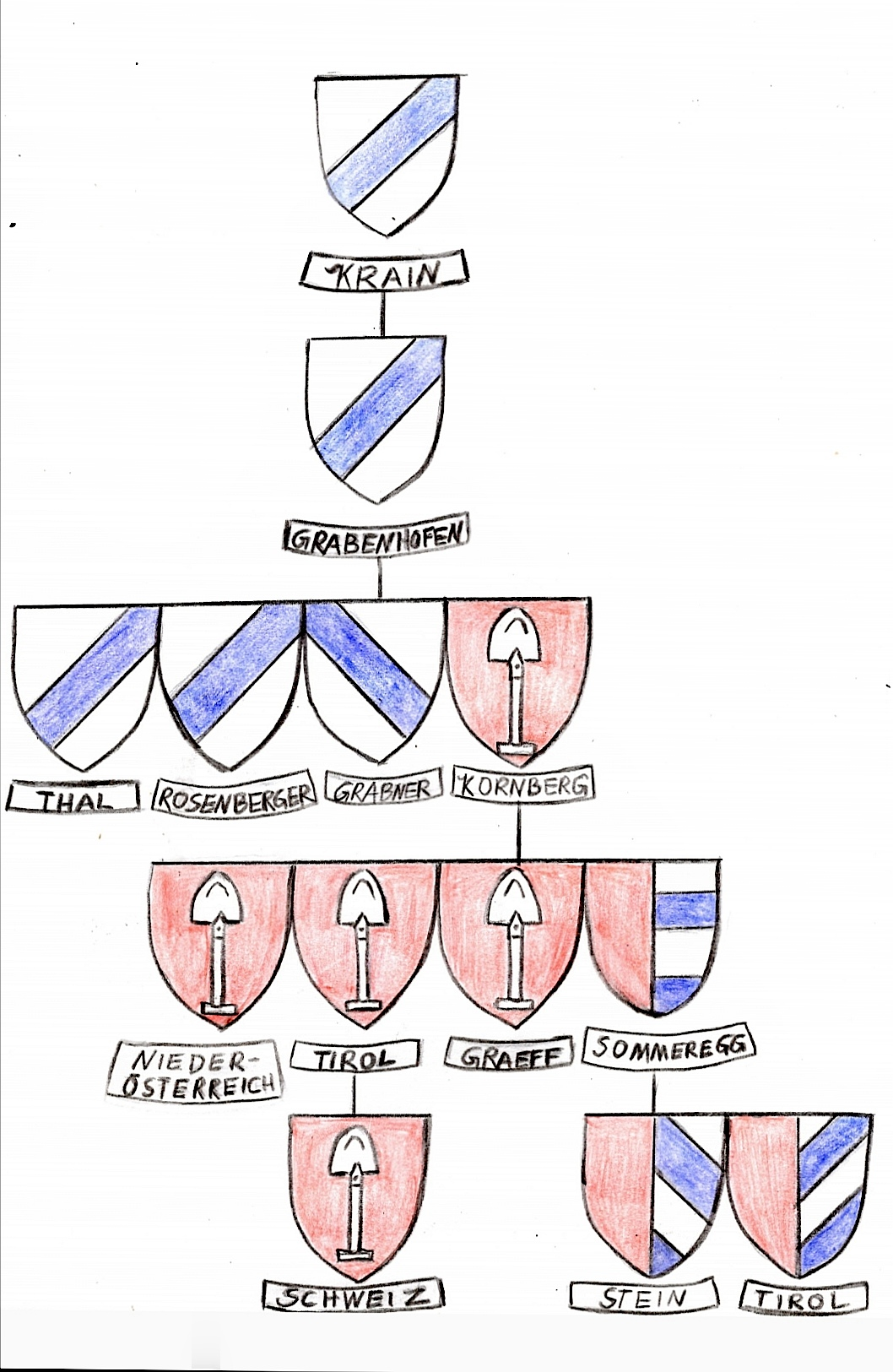
Heraldic family tree of the Graben and their descendants

=== Career ===
With the Sommeregg line, Andreas von Graben founded the branch of the family based in the Duchy of Carinthia and the County of Gorizia (in today's East Tyrol), which also had a different coat of arms; split by red and split three times by silver and blue (silver-white oblique bar equal to Graben's lineage at Graben Castle in Krain / Carniola).

Andreas von Graben was in the service of the Counts of Cilli for over four decades. In 1423 he was Burgrave of Landskron, and in a military conflict between Count Hermann III von Cilli with the Burgamt, the city of Villach, he also led the Cillian forces against the surrounding area, which was in fiefdom of the bishops of Bamberg. At the intervention of Prince-Bishop Friedrich III von Aufseß with Archduke Ernest "the Iron" of Austria, Von Graben had to withdraw from Bamberg areas on the orders of the Cillier. In 1433, Von Graben served as a captain (Hauptmann, a sort of stadtholder) of the former Ortenburg Estate which belonged to the Counts of Celje.

In 1436, Count Frederick II of Celje gave Andreas von Graben the burgraviate (a sort of viscount) and rulership of Sommeregg as a pledge. In 1442 the Cillier gave him and his legitimate sons Sommeregg with the usual castle hat for life, which he chose as his new family residence In 1445 he was involved in the fierce feud between Count Henry VI of Gorizia and his wife Catherine von Gara and later supported the military campaigns of his bellicose liege lord Count Ulrich II of Celje. On interventions and demands of the Emperor Friedrich III to Count Heinrich II and Ulrich II von Cilli, Andreas von Graben had to return the conquests he had made for the Cilliers to the now reconciled Gorizia ruling couple. In 1450 he was also named as Burggraf of Sternberg, near Wernberg.

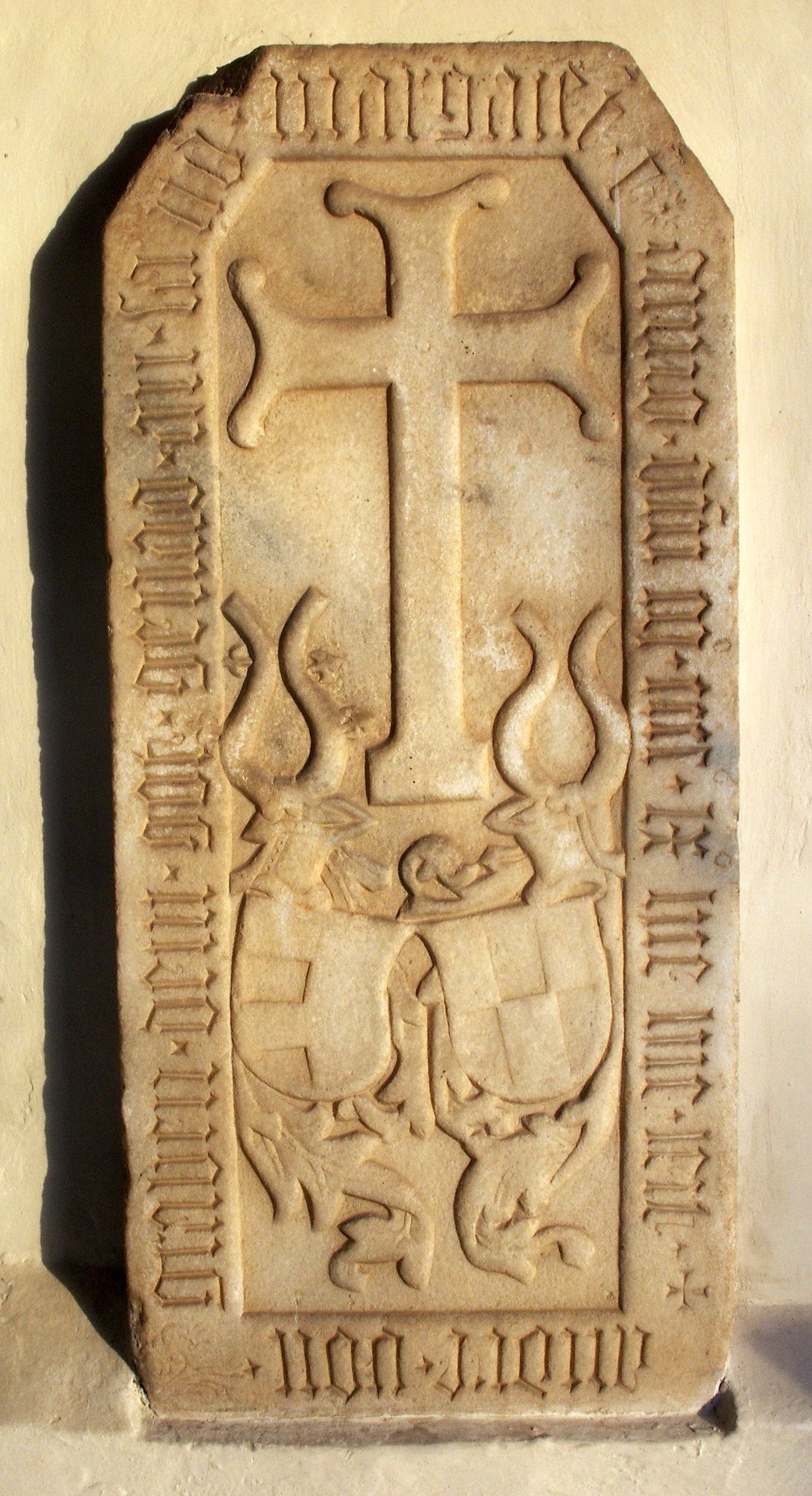
Tomb at the Treffling church

Upon the extinction of the Counts of Celje in 1456, their estates were seized by Emperor Frederick III of the Habsburg dynasty. He enforced a settlement with the Counts of Gorizia, whereupon Andreas von Graben had to renounce his conquests and also lost his office as stadtholder of the Ortenburg estates. Nevertheless, he still is documented as a liege lord around Vellach in 1458, and owner of Falkenstein Castle in 1462.

In addition to Sommeregg, Andreas von Graben also expanded the parish churches of Treffling (Seeboden municipality) and Lieseregg (in present-day Seeboden) near his Sommeregg residence rebuilt. A winged altar created by Thomas von Villach contains the coat of arms of Andreas von Graben, who died in 1463, in the image of the crowning with thorns. Various coats of arms of Andreas and his family can still be found in the area around Lienz, Sommeregg and Ortenburg.
