= Burg Sommeregg =

Medieval castle in Carinthia, Austria

Coordinates: 46°50′3″N 13°31′25″E

Sommeregg Castle
- Carinthia, Austria
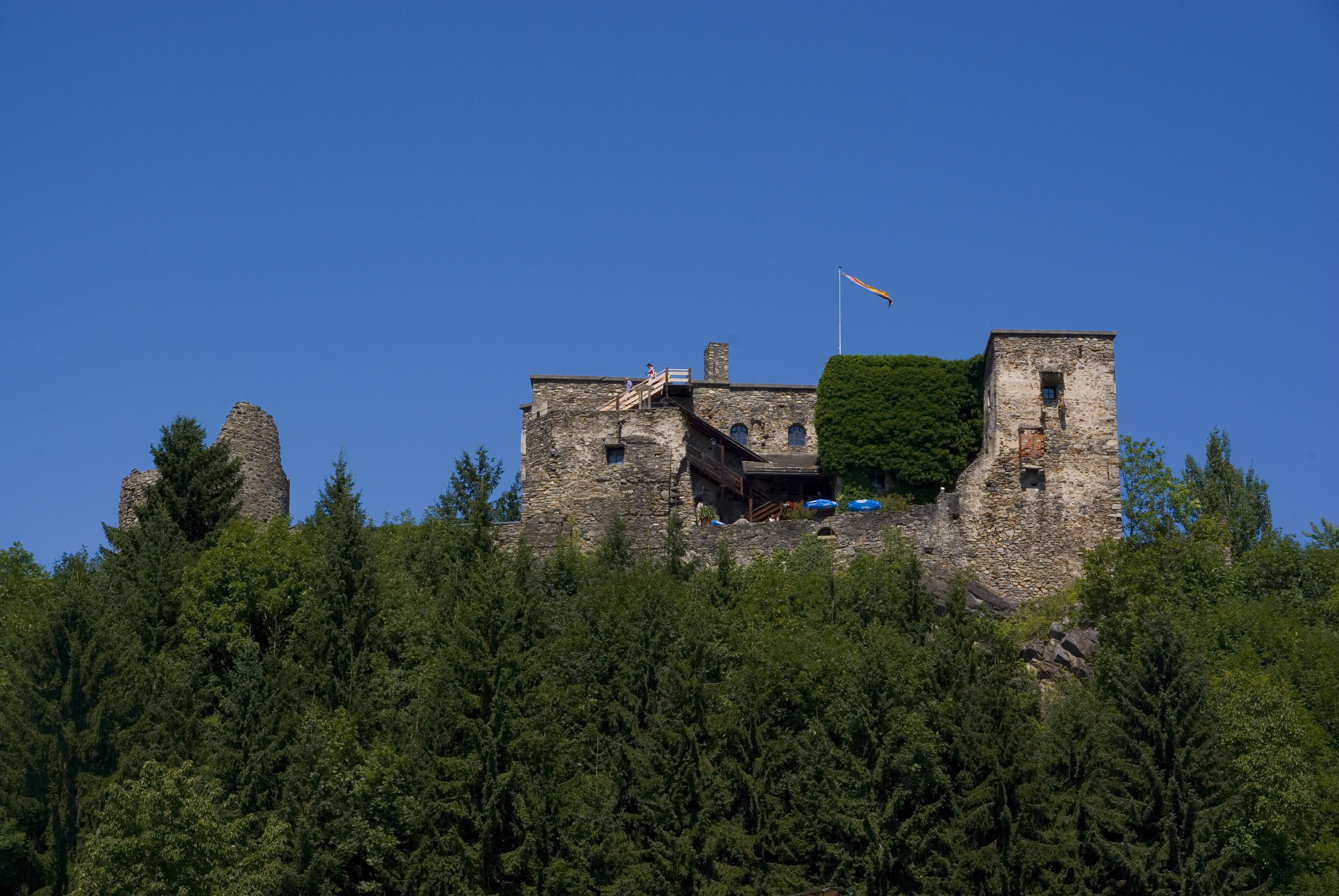

Site information
- Type: Hill castle
- Owner: Private
- Open to the public: Yes

Site history
- Built: 12th century
- Built by: Witemarus von Sommeregg
- Battles/wars: Austrian–Hungarian War (1487)
- Events: Ritterspiele (medieval reenactment)

Garrison information
- Past commanders: Andreas von Graben, Virgil von Graben

Sommeregg is a medieval castle near Seeboden in the Austrian state of Carinthia, Austria. It is situated in the foothills of the Nock Mountains at an altitude of 749 m.

During the feudal period, Sommeregg was the seat of the Lord and Burgrave of Sommeregg until 1652. In 1442 the Sommeregg District Court was able to become independent from the County of Ortenburg, which led to an upgrading of the rule.

The fortress served as an administrative seat in the Upper Carinthian estates held by the Counts of Ortenburg and Celje; it later was the residence of the Graben and Khevenhüller dynasties; ministeriales of the Austrian House of Habsburg.

== History ==
=== Early times ===
The castle was probably erected in the 12th century, as one Witemarus de Sumereke was already mentioned in an 1187 deed issued at Neustift Abbey in Tyrol. The Lords of Sommeregg then served as ministeriales of Count Otto II of Ortenburg, who ruled over extended estates in Upper Carinthia, rivalling with the House of Gorizia and the Salzburg archbishops. On 29 May 1275 the marriage of Otto's granddaughter, Euphemia of Ortenburg-Hardegg, with Count Albert I of Gorizia was arranged here.

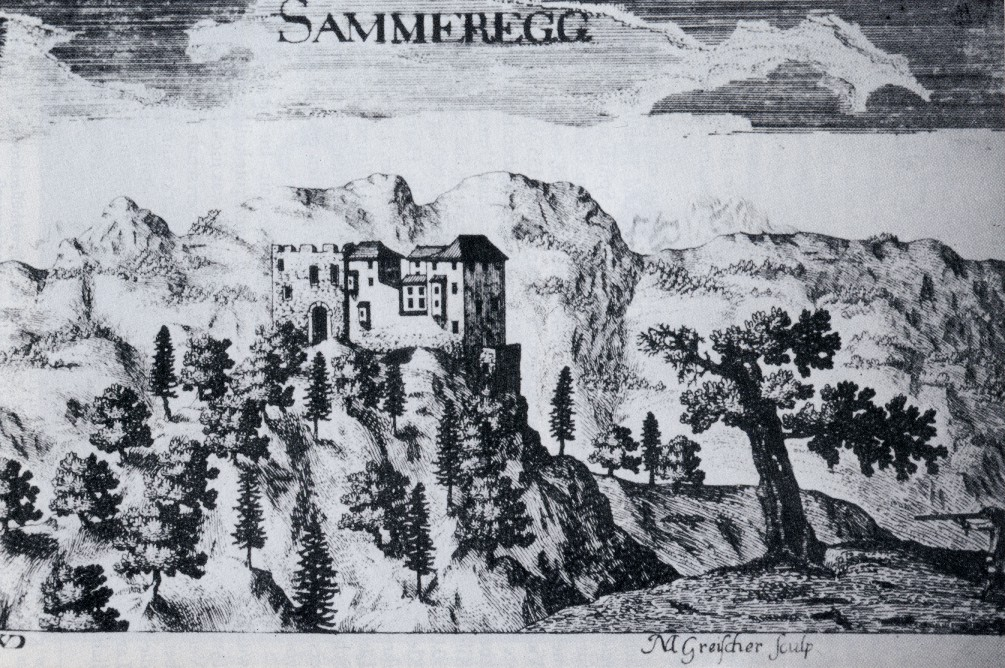
Sammeregg, engraving from Topographia Archiducatus Carinthiae by Johann Weikhard Valvasor, 1681

In the 14th century, the Lords of Sommeregg achieved the knightly status of Ortenburg burgraves and castellans with comprehensive administrative and military responsibilities in the lordship of the manor. When the Counts of Ortenburg became extinct in 1418, their possessions passed to the Counts of Celje in Carniola, who left the administration of the remote Upper Carinthian estates to local stadtholders.

=== Von Graben ===
In 1442 the Styrian noble Andreas von Graben by marriage inherited the Sommeregg burgraviate. His rights were acknowledged by Count Frederick II of Celje and the castle became a residence of the House of Graben. This family maintained the title of Sommeregg burgraves, even when the last Celje count Ulrich II was murdered in 1456. After a long dispute with Count John II of Gorizia, the former Ortenburg possessions fell to the Habsburg emperor Frederick III, who confirmed the feudal rights of the Graben family. Andreas von Graben was succeeded by his son Virgil von Graben in 1463, however, in 1487 the castle was occupied and devastated by Hungarian forces under King Matthias Corvinus on his campaign against the Austrian Habsburgs. Afterwards Virgil von Graben had the fortress rebuilt in its current appearance. Through his niece and heiress Rosina von Graben von Rain (d. 1534), Sommeregg passed via her husband Haymeran IV von Rain zu Sommeregg to the Bavarian Lords of Rainer zu Rain.

=== Further history ===
In 1550 it was purchased by the Carinthian noble Christoph Khevenhüller, whose descendants held the castle until 1628. The Sommeregg manor was dissolved upon the Revolution of 1848.

=== Lords and Burgraves of Sommeregg ===
Time	Owner	Lord and Burgrave of the Fief
1187–1418	Counts of Ortenburg	until 1338 Lords of Sommeregg, later the Families Von Treffen, Steierberger, Maltteiner, Von Katsch and Hallegger (Von Hallegg)
1418–1456	Counts of Celje	Family Von Hallegg, since 1442 Lords Von Graben as Burggrafen (a sort of Viscounts)
1456–1628	House of Habsburg	Lords Von Graben, since 1509 Georg and Rosina Goldacher, Haymeran von Rain zu Sommeregg and Rosina von Graben von Rain, since 1550 Christoph Khevenhüller von Aichelberg and his following
1628–1651	Landlord Count Hans Wittmann	
1651–1932	Counts / Family Von Lodron	
1932–1940	Josef Penker	
1940–1969	Josef Riebler / Daughter Helene as Baroness Rosenberg de la Marre	
1969–1992	Family Elfi / Andreas Egger	
1992-	Family Riegler	

== See also ==
- List of castles in Austria
