= Graebner =

Graebner or Gräbner is a German surname. Notable people with the surname include:

- Carole Caldwell Graebner, (1943–2008), American tennis player
- Clark Graebner, (born 1943), American tennis player
- Fritz Graebner, (1877–1934), German ethnologist
- Viktor Eberhard Gräbner (1914–1944), German SS officer

== See also ==
- Grabner
