= Rainer zu Rain =

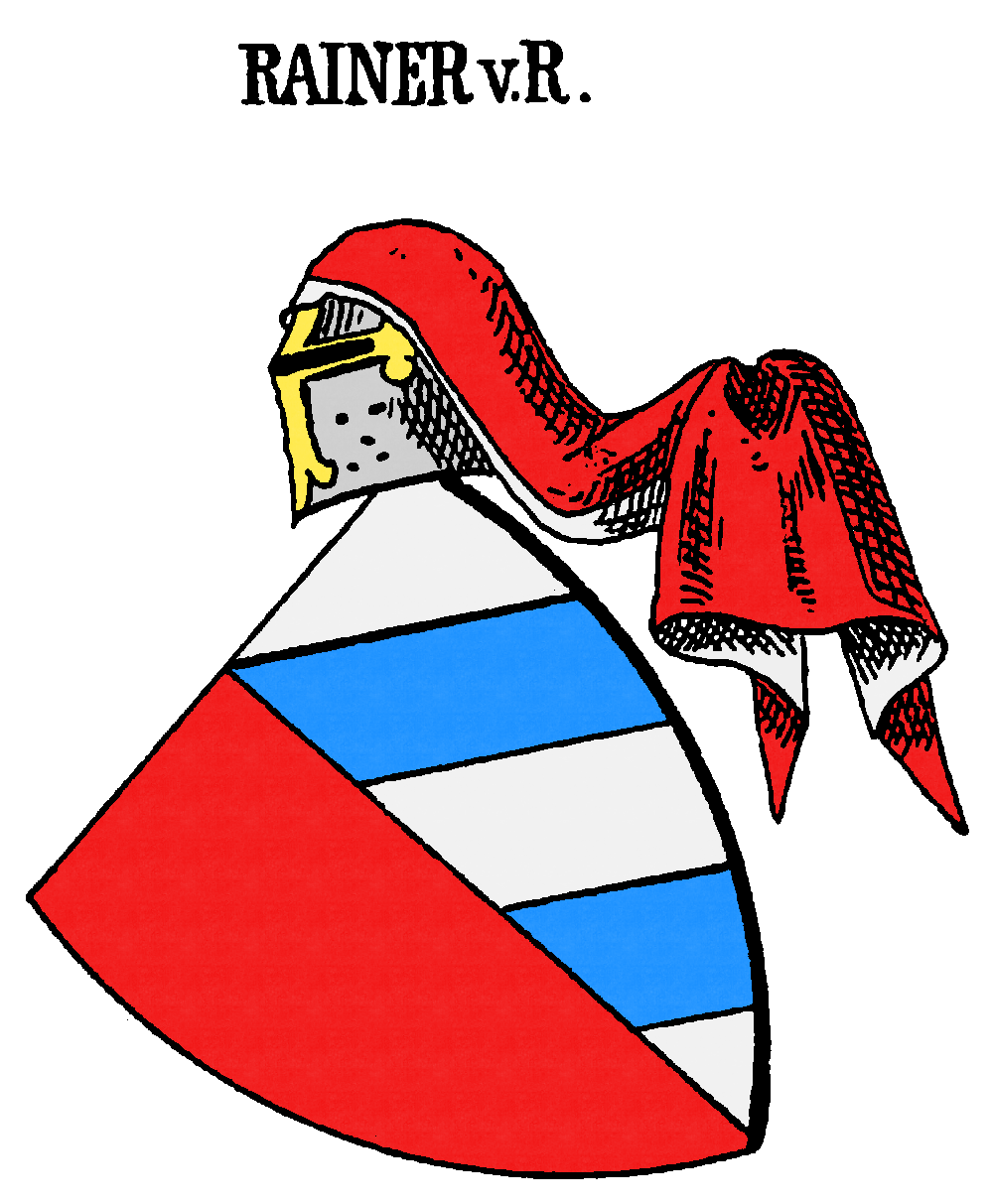
Ancient coat of arms Rainer zu Rain

The Rainer zu Rain family (also Von Rain, Rainer, Von Rain zu Sommeregg) is an old Lower Bavarian noble family. The family represented a branch of the Vitztum von Straubing and held the hereditary rank of chief chamberlain in the Duchy of Bavaria. The line from Rain zu Sommeregg, which immigrated to Carinthia at the beginning of the 16th century, was raised to the rank of baron as heirs of von Graben to burgraves and lords of Sommeregg.

== History ==
The Rainer zu Rain were considered old tournament nobility, and therefore stood out within the lower nobility as a more respected family. The family remained in Rain until the mid-16th century. They held the hereditary office of chief treasurer of the Duchy of Bavaria. The Carinthian line was founded by Hayman IV von Rain zu Sommeregg († 1543), who came from Bavaria and married Rosina von Graben zu Sommeregg from the von Graben family. Rosina was the heiress to the Sommeregger burgrave Ernst von Graben, and so in 1513 this estate, various other estates and the blue and white coat of arms of the Graben passed to the von Rain family. Haymeran was in the service of Emperor Ferdinand I and served the imperial family as a field captain in Italy. For their services, the brothers Haymeran and Christoph Reiner [Rainer, Von Rain] were appointed barons of Rain zu Sommeregg by Emperor Charles V on 10 November 1530. The marriage of Haymeran and Rosina produced at least three daughters, including Beatrix von Rain († 1538), and a son, Hans Joachim von Rain zu Sommeregg, who was married to Catharina Auwetia from Auburg. Since Hans Joachim, as heir to his uncle Christoph II Rainer zu Rain, moved the center of his rule back to Bavaria in 1548, he sold Sommeregg and the Töplitsch district in 1550 to Christoph Khevenhüller von Aichelberg. Shortly after Hans Joachim von Rain's return home, the entire family died out. The heiress Ursula Freiin von und zu Rain (died 1588) married Paul (Paulus) von Leublfing auf Hautzenstein and Salern zu Rain and Grafentraubach (died 1592) in 1573 and also brought Rain Castle and Lordship to the marriage.

== Literature ==
- Katja Putzer: Das Geschlecht der Rainer zu Rain. Zur Geschichte einer späteren thurn und taxisschen Herrschaft in Niederbayern (13. Jh. – 1569). Verlag Friedrich Pustet, Regensburg 2018, ISBN 9783791729985. (Buchankündigung)
