= Burgruine Weidenburg =

Castle ruin in Austria

Coordinates: 46.6479°N 13.0569°E

- Carinthia, Austria
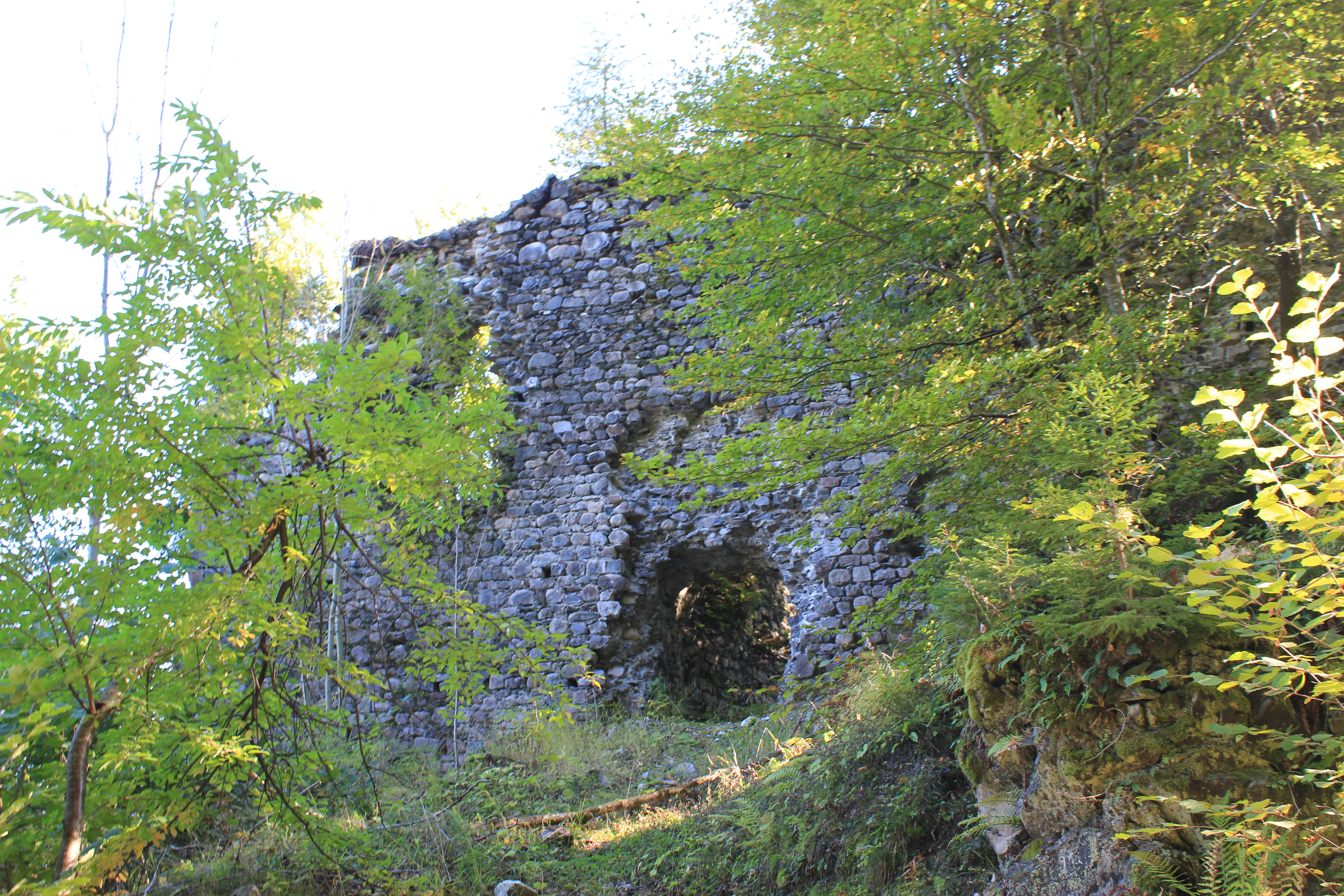
- Ruins of Burgruine Weidenburg in 2011

Site information
- Type: Spur castle

Site history
- Built: Probably 12th century

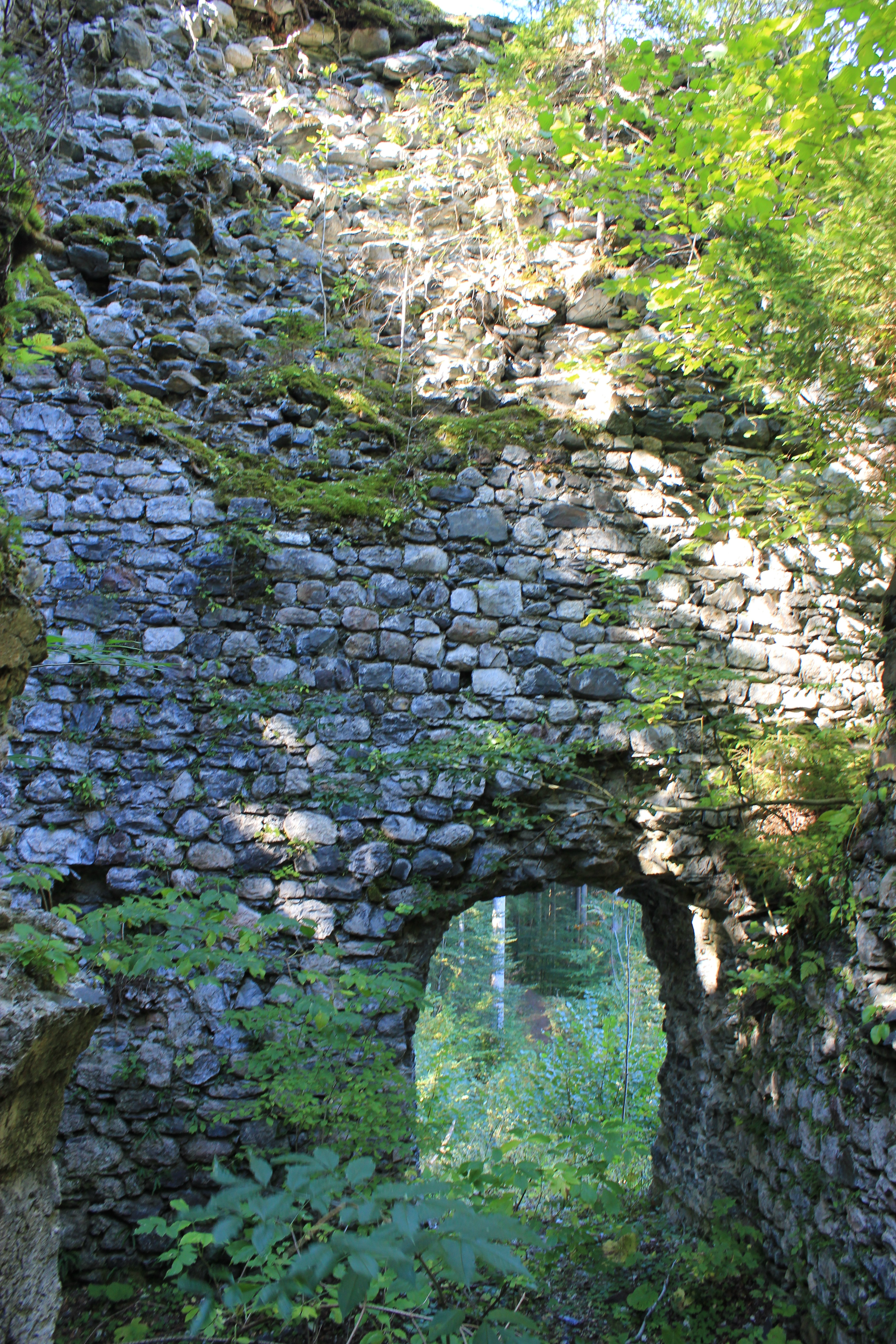
Ruins of Burgruine Weidenburg in 2011

Burgruine Weidenburg is a ruinous medieval castle in Carinthia, Austria. It was probably built in the 12th century and fell into disrepair after 1500.

== See also ==
- List of castles in Austria
