= Virgil von Graben =

Austrian noble, politician and diplomat

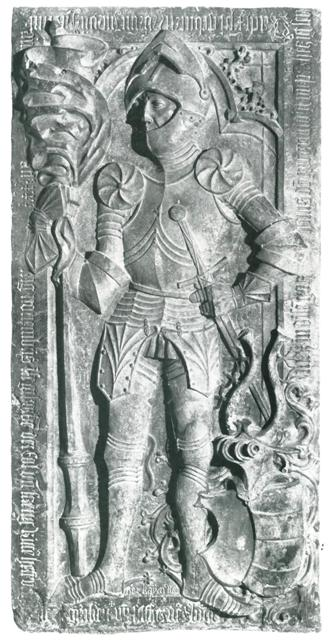

Virgil von Graben at the Sankt Michaelskirche in Lienz (16th century)

Burggraf of Lienz, Heinfels, Sommeregg and Lengberg
- In office 1430/1440–1507
- Preceded by: Andreas von Graben as Burggraf of Sommeregg
- Succeeded by: Rosina von Graben von Rain as Burggräfin of Sommeregg - The Prince-Bishop of Brixen Melchior von Meckau as Lord of Heinfels

Stadtholder and captain and stadtholder of Görz
- In office 1490–1504
- Preceded by: Ulvinus von Dornberg
- Succeeded by: Erasmus von Dornberg

Stadtholder of Lienz and East Tyrol
- In office 1500–1507
- Preceded by: Leonhard of Gorizia
- Succeeded by: Michael von Wolkenstein

Personal details
- Born: 15th century Castle Sommeregg
- Died: 1507 Castle Sommeregg
- Spouse: Agnes (morganatic marriage)
- Relations: Andreas von Graben (father), Barbara Hallecker (mother)
- Children: Lukas von Graben zum Stein, Rosina, and four morganatic children with Agnes
- Occupation: Burggraf and Stadtholder

Virgil von Graben (1430/1440–1507), also Virgil vom Graben, was an Austrian noble, politician and diplomat. He was one of the most important noblemen and officials in the County of Gorizia and in the Habsburg Empire of Frederick III. and Maximilian I.

== Introduction ==
Virgil von Graben belonged to the Carinthian-East Tyrolean branch of the family Von Graben which held important offices at the time of the last Counts of Gorizia and through whose work Renaissance culture also found its way into East Tyrol. Virgil von Graben was considered the "richest and most capable Gorizia nobleman of his time". He was under the last Meinhardin Count Leonhard, whose guarantor he was, regent of the princely county and captain of Gorizia, trusted councilor of Count Leonhard and the Roman-German King Maximilian. As such, he directed and completed the takeover of the County of Gorizia into the possession of the Habsburgs under whom he remained governor (captain) of the County of Gorizia. In addition, von Graben was stadholder, Burgrave (or pledgee) of Lienz.

== Biography ==
=== Family ===
Virgil von Graben was the son of Andreas von Graben and his wife was Barbara von Hallegg, daughter of Jörg von Hallegg (Hallecker), imperial counsellor and Administrator / Landeshauptmann of Carinthia. One of his nephews was Ladislaus Prager, Hereditary Marshal of the duchy of Carinthia and Chamberlain of Emperor Frederik III. Virgil von Graben was married to Dorothea Arnold, née Herbst (von Herbstenburg), but their marriage was not considered legal, so Virgil's sons could not inherit his estates:

- Christof von Graben († 1506), who is mentioned as a pastor of Gorizia in 1498
- Lukas von Graben zum Stein († 1550) was appointed lord of Stein in 1500 by Maximilian I, and thus the ancestor of the line am Stein, which retained the dominion until the death of Christof David von Graben zum Stein († 1664)
- Barthlmä von Graben (Bartholomeus von Graben), about whom little is known; Between 1501 and 1511 he was the owner of the Treffling farm, which he gave as a fief to his fiefdom Andreen Hohenburger; his descendants moved to and formed the second Tyrolean line, which died out with the death of Felix Jakob von Graben (zum Stein) in 1776 (or 1780).
- Virgil Lucz von Graben (named or died 1550); possibly the father of Leonhard (Lienhard) von Graben (mentioned 1507–1545), who was awarded the parish church of Gorizia in 1507

It is said that Virgil had another son, Leonhard von Graben († 1531).

In addition to his noble born offspring, Virgil von Graben fathered four illegitimate children with his morganatic wife named Agnes, whom he endowed with rich goods

==== Heritage ====
Since all of Virgil's sons were from his not legally binding marriage to Dorothea von Arnold (née Herbst von Herbstenburg) none of them could claim his inheritance. His brothers Heinrich, Cosmas, Wolfgang and Wolf Andrä von Graben also had no heirs. So Sommeregg, along with smaller estates, came to Rosina von Graben von Rain, the daughter of his older brother Ernst von Graben.

==== Castle Graben ====
Virgil von Graben is listed by Valvasor in his work The honor of the Hertzogthums Crain 1499 as the owner of the lordship and castle Graben, the ancestral seat of his family (named 1170), located near Rudolfswerth (today: Novo mesto) in Carniola. This was originally owned by the Carniolan family line, but was first mentioned in 1330 as the property of Ulrich II von Graben of the Kornberg line, from which Virgil descended via his father Andreas von Graben zu Sommeregg, who was born at Schloss Kornberg. After him, the Von Graben family estate seems to have fallen back to the Kornberg line, since Valvasor in 1520 lists the brothers Andree, Wilhelm and Wolfgang von Graben from the same line.

==== Coat of arms ====
Originally, the family of Virgils father Andreas von Graben of Kornberg carried the coat of arms with the shovel (silver shovel on red), but adopted the oblique beam coat of arms (red, split by blue and silver) in Ortenburg services.

=== Career ===
Around 1461, Virgil and his father Andreas von Graben were taken prisoner by the Counts of Gorizia. They had to swear feud, and Virgil then probably entered the service of the Counts of Gorizia. In addition to his fiefs of the Archdiocese of Salzburg in Upper Carinthia and East Tyrol, he appeared as a captain (governeur) of the County of Gorizia from 1474/75.

In 1463 Virgil von Graben inherited the Sommeregg estate from his father Andreas von Graben.

Virgil von Graben was a feudal man in the service of the Archbishop of Salzburg and was his caretaker resp. Burgrave at Lengberg Castle in East Tyrol. With his appointment, the heyday of Lengberg began. In the years 1480-85 he had the former "veste Lengenberch" converted into a representative Gothic castle at his own expense.

In 1487 Sommeregg was conquered by Hungarian troops led by Matthias Corvinus, who were fighting the German-Roman Emperor Frederick III stood, conquered and destroyed. The reconstruction, which was initiated by Virgil von Graben after the withdrawal of the foreign army, gave the castle its typical irregular shape. From the end of the 15th century until his death in 1507, Virgil von Graben was the burgrave of Gorizia and lord of Heinfels in the Puster Valley.

==== Controversy over the County of Gorizia ====
Virgil von Graben had great influence on the political events of this dilapidated principality as captain (governor) of the County of Gorizia. In 1476 Virgil von Graben, together with Bishop Gerg Golser von Brixen, Balthasar von Welsberg and Phoebus von Thurn, represented Count Leonhard of Gorizia at the court of Margrave Ludovico Gonzaga in Mantua in order to solemnly promise his marriage to Gonzaga's daughter Paola Gonzaga.

During the reign of the ailing Count Leonhard of Gorizia, Virgil von Graben was persuaded by grand promises by King Maximilian I to end his hitherto secret association with the Venetians and instead advocate the country's accession to the Habsburg Empire. The enlightened views of Venice and its decision-makers would have recognized the Gorizian (Meinhardin) bastard Virgil von Graben himself as the new Count of Gorizia (it was said that the Von Graben descendant from the House of Gorizia). Another suggestion was that Von Graben would hand over the County of Gorizia to the Republic and in exchange would receive all Gorizia castles and lordships in Friuli and Venice as a fief. But it didn't come to that. In 1498, Virgil von Graben gave his son Lukas von Graben authority over the gorizian Burghut. First, the Council of Ten of the Republic of Venice considered appointing Lukas von Graben as their supreme commander in Friuli. However, since Virgil von Graben ended the contract with Venice about the succession in the County of Gorizia and negotiated with Maximilian I, this appointment did not materialize.

==== In imperial Service ====
After the death of Count Leonhard on 12 April 1500 and the Gorizia inheritance in favor of the Habsburgs, the Venetians saw their failure solely in the actions of the lords Virgil and Lukas von Graben. After the successful conversion of the Gorizia county into the Habsburg Empire, Virgil von Graben was modestly rewarded, measured against his immense merit. However, von Graben continued to act as governor and captain of Lienz and East Tyrol as well as captain of Gorizia; meanwhile he also lived in Bruck Castle for a short time. Furthermore, after 1500, von Graben was also cited as the burgrave of Lienz.
