= Grabner =

Grabner is a German surname. Notable people with the surname include:

- Hermann Grabner (1886–1969), Austrian composer and music teacher
- Maximilian Grabner (1905–1948), Austrian Nazi Gestapo chief in Auschwitz, executed for crimes against humanity
- Michael Grabner (born 1987), Austrian ice hockey player
- Michelle Grabner (born 1962), American painter
- Siegfried Grabner (born 1975), Austrian snowboarder

== See also ==
- Graebner
- Marshall Station, California, United States settlement formerly known as Grabners
