= Roman Catholic Diocese of Caorle =

The Diocese of Caorle (Latin: Dioecesis Caprulana seu Caprularum) was a Roman Catholic ecclesiastical territory in the coastal town of Caorle in the province of Venice, Veneto.

== History ==
• 600s: Established as the Diocese of Caorle • 1818 May 1: Suppressed to the Patriarchate of Venice • 1968: Restored as the Titular Episcopal See of Caorle

== Ordinaries ==
- Pietro Carlo (12 Jul 1470 - 1513 Resigned)
- Daniel Rossi (bishop) (9 May 1513 - 1538 Resigned)
- Sebastiano Rossi (bishop) (30 Oct 1538 - 1542 Died)
- Egidio Falcetta de Cingulo (15 Mar 1542 - 30 Jan 1563 Appointed, Bishop of Bertinoro)
- Giulio Soperchio, O. Carm. (30 Jan 1563 - 16 Oct 1585 Died)
- Girolamo Righetto (Ragazzinus), C.R.L. (24 Jan 1586 - 1593 Died)
- Angelo Casarino, O.P. (5 Jul 1593 - 1 Mar 1600 Died)
- Luigi de Grigis, O.F.M. (24 Jan 1601 - 1609 Died)
- Benedetto Benedetti (18 Aug 1610 - 1629 Resigned)
- Angelo Castellari, O.M. (17 Sep 1629 - May 1641 Died)
- Vincenzo Milani (1 Jul 1641 - 19 Dec 1644 Appointed, Bishop of Hvar)
- Giuseppe Maria Piccini, O.P. (20 Mar 1645 - 25 May 1648 Died)
- Giorgio Darmini (24 Nov 1653 - 30 Aug 1655 Appointed, Bishop of Novigrad)
- Pietro Martire Rusca, O.F.M. Conv. (14 Feb 1656 - 29 Apr 1674 Died)
- Francesco Antonio Boscaroli, O.F.M. Conv. (17 Dec 1674 - 23 Oct 1679 Died)
- Domenico Minio (24 Apr 1684 - 5 Jun 1698 Died)
- Francesco Andrea Grassi (30 Mar 1700 - Jan 1712 Died)
- Daniele Sansoni (11 Jul 1712 - 14 Jun 1717 Appointed, Bishop of Novigrad)
- Giovanni Vincenzo de Filippi, O.S.M. (11 May 1718 Appointed - 16 Feb 1738 Died)
- Francesco Trevisan Suarez (24 Nov 1738 - 25 Jan 1769 Died)
- Giovanni Benedetto Maria Ciuran (Civran) (6 Aug 1770 - 15 Jul 1776 Confirmed, Bishop of Chioggia)
- Stefano Domenico Sceriman, O.P. (16 Dec 1776 - 1 Jun 1795 Confirmed, Bishop of Chioggia)
- Giuseppe Maria Peruzzi (22 Sep 1795 - 18 Sep 1807 Confirmed, Bishop of Chioggia)

== See also ==
- Catholic Church in Italy
