= Rosina von Graben von Rain =

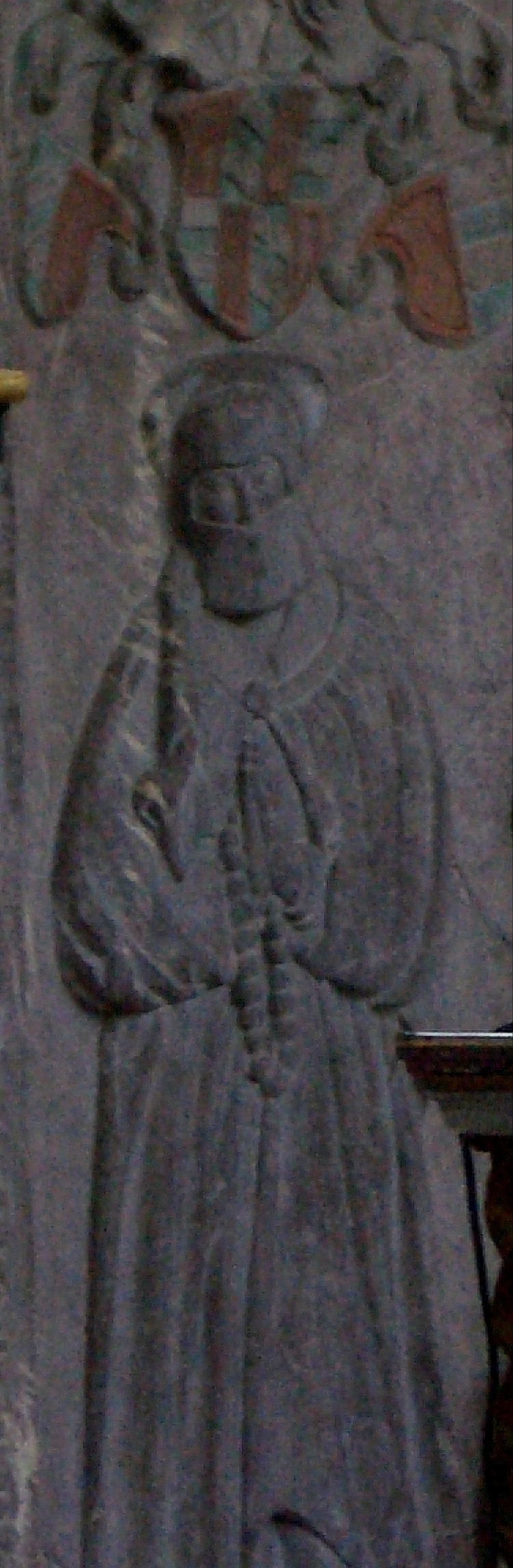
Tomb at St. Michael's Church, Lienz

Rosina von Graben von Rain (died 1534), also called Rosina von Rain, was an Austrian noble woman, a member of the Graben von Stein family and heiress of the burgraviate of Sommeregg Castle in Carinthia.

== Biography ==
=== Family Von Graben ===
Rosina's father was the carinthian noble Ernst von Graben (d. 1513), son of Andreas von Graben (d. 1463), who ruled as burgrave at Sommeregg since 1507. Andreas had been an official of the Counts of Celje at Ortenburg; after their extinction in 1456, his son Ernst had received the Sommeregg estates in Upper Carinthia as a fief from the hands of the Habsburg king Maximilian I. Ernst's brother Virgil von Graben, Rosina's uncle, was a very powerful Austrian noble, Habsburg stattholder in the County of Gorizia and Maximilan's councillor.

==== Heritage of Sommeregg ====
Since all of Virgil von Grabens sons were from his not legally binding marriage to Dorothea von Arnold (née Herbst von Herbstenburg) none of them could claim his inheritance. His brothers Heinrich, Cosmas, Wolfgang and Wolf Andrä von Graben also had no heirs. So Sommeregg, along with smaller estates, came to Rosina von Graben von Rain and her family, the Rainer von Rain.

=== Life ===
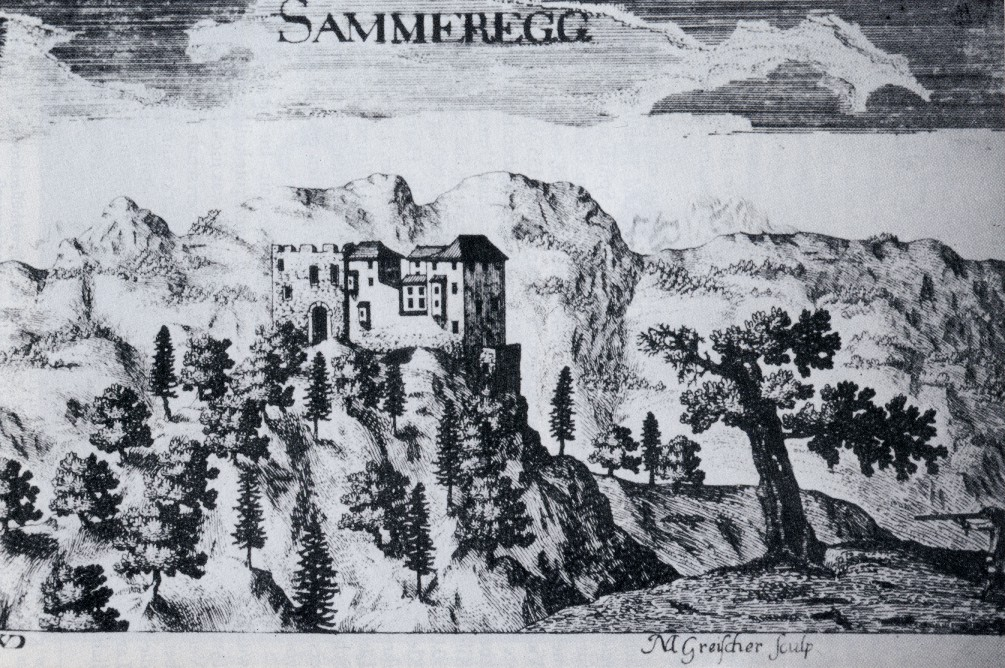
Sammeregg, engraving by Johann Weikhard Valvasor, 1680

Upon her father's death in 1513, Rosina followed him up as burgravine (a sort of Viscountess) of the Sommeregg estates. She became also Lady of Doberdò within the comital lands of Gorizia.

Rosina was married twice: first to the ministerialis Georg Goldacher, her second husband was Haymeran von Rain zu Sommeregg, a member of the Bavarian nobility who was elevated to the rank of a Freiherr zu Sommeregg by Emperor Charles V in 1530. The couple sold Doberdò to the Counts of Attems in 1522 and concentrated on consolidating their Carinthian possessions. However, their eldest son Hans Joachim von Rain returned to Bavaria and in 1550 sold the castle and the lordship of Sommeregg to Christoph Khevenhüller, castellan of nearby Ortenburg Castle. Hans Joachims daughter Ursula von Rain was the last member of the Rainer zu Rain family and married Paul von Leiblfing in 1573. This also gave the coat of arms of the Graben-Rain to the bavarian Leiblfing family.

Rosina's and her husband Haymeran's tomb chapel is to be found of at the St Michael's Church in Lienz.

== Literature ==
- Matthias Laurenz Gräff: Rosina von Graben († 1534), Bildnis einer Edelfrau aus der Renaissance (2026)
