= List of family trees =

This is an index of family trees on the English Wikipedia. It includes noble, politically important, and royal families as well as fictional families and thematic diagrams. This list is organized according to alphabetical order.

== Americas ==
=== Brazil ===
- Brazilian Imperial Family

=== Canada ===
- Bronfman family
- Hart family, (professional wrestling)
- Family of Snorri Thorfinnson, first European born in the Americas
- Family tree of Thomson family

=== Mexico ===
- Mexican emperors
- Aztec emperors family tree

=== Nicaragua ===
- Family tree of Chamorro

=== Peru ===
- Sapa Inca Dynasty, Rulers of Cuzco and the Inca Empire

=== United States ===
- Adams family (U.S. politics)
- Astor family (U.S. politics/U.K. peerage)
- Baldwin family (professional performers)
- Bush family (U.S. politics)
- Coppola family
- Dummer family
- Du Pont family
- Henry Fonda's family
- Hilton family
- Kennedy family (U.S. politics)
- Kohler family
- Mathews family (U.S. politics)
- McMahon family
- Morgan family (banking)
- Pritzker family
- Rockefeller family
- Roosevelt family (U.S. politics)
- Taft family (U.S. politics)
- Udall family (U.S. politics)
- Vanderbilt family
- Walton family

== Asia ==
=== Bangladesh ===
- Ispahani family
- Sheikh–Wazed family

=== Brunei ===
- Brunei

=== Cambodia ===
- Khmer Empire
- Cambodian monarchs' family tree, current and past
- House of Sisowath

=== China ===
==== Chinese dynasties ====
- Ancient (from the Three Sovereigns and Five Emperors to the Spring and Autumn period)
  - Eastern Zhou
  - Five Emperors
  - Shang
  - Western Zhou
  - Xia
- Warring States
- Early (from the Qin dynasty to the Sixteen Kingdoms)
  - Cao Wei
  - Cheng Han
  - Eastern Han
  - Eastern Jin
  - Eastern Wu
  - Former Liang
  - Former Qin
  - Former Yan
  - Han Zhao
  - Hu Xia
  - Later Liang
  - Later Qin
  - Later Yan
  - Later Zhao
  - Northern Liang
  - Northern Yan
  - Qin
  - Shu Han
  - Southern Liang
  - Southern Yan
  - Western Han
  - Western Jin
  - Western Liang
  - Western Qin
  - Xin
- Middle (from the Northern and Southern dynasties to end of the Southern Song)
  - Chen
  - Eastern Wei
  - Former Shu
  - Jin
  - Jingnan
  - Later Han
  - Later Jin
  - Later Liang
  - Later Shu
  - Later Tang
  - Later Zhou
  - Liang
  - Liao
  - Liu Song
  - Ma Chu
  - Min
  - Northern Han
  - Northern Qi
  - Northern Song
  - Northern Wei
  - Northern Zhou
  - Southern Han
  - Southern Qi
  - Southern Song
  - Southern Tang
  - Sui
  - Tang
  - Western Liao
  - Western Wei
  - Western Xia
  - Wuyue
  - Wu Zhou
  - Yang Wu
- Late (from the Yuan dynasty to the Qing dynasty)
  - Later Jin
  - Ming
  - Northern Yuan
  - Qing
  - Southern Ming
  - Yuan

==== Non-monarchical ====
- Main line of descent from Confucius

=== India ===
- Tata family
- Birla family
- Kapoor family
- Mughal emperors
  - Descent of Mughal Dynasty from Tamerlane and Genghis Khan
- Sikh gurus
- Rajas of Pratapgarh
- Nizam Shahi dynasty
- Qutb Shahi dynasty

==== Princely states ====
- Travancore royal family
- Maharaja of Mysore
- Nizam of Hyderabad
- Maharaja of Jammu and Kashmir
- Maharaja of Baroda
- Nawab of Bhopal
- Maharaja of Tripura

=== Iran ===
- Achaemenid dynasty (550–330 BC)
- Seleucid Empire (312 - 63 BC)
- Arsacid dynasty (247 BC – AD 224)
- Sasanid dynasty (224–651)

Iranian Intermezzo

- Tahirid
- Ziyarid
- Ghurid

Modern Iran

- Safavid dynasty (1501–1722/1736)
- Afsharid dynasty (1736–1796)
- Zand dynasty (1750–1794)
- Qajar dynasty (1781–1925)
- Pahlavi dynasty (1925–1979)

=== Israel ===
- Kings of Israel and Judah
- Herzog family

=== Japan ===
==== Imperial family, nobility and shoguns ====
- Japanese Emperors family tree
- Fujiwara family tree
  - Fujiwara Clan (template)
- Soga clan
- Taira clan
- Seiwa Genji/Minamoto clan, shōguns of Japan
- Hōjō clan
- Kamakura shōguns and Hōjō shikken
- Ashikaga clan (Ashikaga shogunate)
- Oda clan and Toyotomi clan
- Tokugawa clan (Tokugawa shogunate)
- Ryukyu Kingdom

==== Daimyō ====
===== Tokugawa branches =====
- Lords of Fukui (Echizen)
  - Lords of Matsue (cadet of the Fukui-Echizen line)
  - Lords of Maebashi (cadet of the Fukui-Echizen line)
  - Lords of Tsuyama (cadet of the Fukui-Echizen line)
  - Lords of Akashi (cadet of the Fukui-Echizen line)
- Lords of Owari
- Lords of Kishū
- Lords of Mito
  - Lords of Takamatsu (cadet of the Mito line)
  - Lords of Kuwana (cadet of the Mito line)
  - Lords of Shimabara (cadet of the Mito line)
  - Lords of Takasu (cadet of the Mito line)
- Lords of Iyo-Matsuyama

===== Others =====
- Lords of Chōshū
- Lords of Fukuoka
- Lords of Hiroshima
- Lords of Kaga
- Lords of Kubota
- Lords of Kumamoto
- Lords of Kurume
- Lords of Morioka
- Lords of Okayama
- Lords of Saga
- Lords of Satsuma
- Lords of Sendai
- Lords of Shōnai
- Lords of Tokushima
- Lords of Tosa
- Lords of Tottori
- Lords of Tsu
- Lords of Tsushima-Fuchū
- Lords of Yonezawa

=== Korea ===
- Balhae
- Baekje
- Goguryeo
- Silla
- Goryeo
- Joseon

=== Malaysia ===
- Kedahan monarchs
- Kelantanese monarchs
- Johorean monarchs
- Negri monarchs
- Pahangese monarchs
- Perakian monarchs
- Perlisian monarchs
- House of Singapura-Melakan
- Selangorean monarchs
- Terengganuan monarchs

=== Middle East ===
Ancient

- Yamhad dynasty
- Sargonid Assyria
- Chaldean Babylon

Medieval

- Kings of Jerusalem

Modern

- Hashemites dynasty of Jordan

=== Mongolia ===
- 1206–1635: The House of Borjigin
- Family tree of the Ilkhans (House of Hulagu)
- Timurid Dynasty of Tamerlane
- Descent of Mughal Dynasty from Tamerlane and Genghis Khan

=== Myanmar ===
Pagan Kingdom
Myinsaing Kingdom
Pinya Kingdom
Sagaing Kingdom
Kingdom of Ava
Prome Kingdom
Hanthawaddy Kingdom
Kingdom of Mrauk U
Taungoo Dynasty
Konbaung Dynasty

=== Sri Lanka ===
- House of Vijaya
- House of Lambakanna I
- House of Moriya
- House of Lambakanna II
- House of Vijayabahu
- House of Kalinga
- House of Sri Sanga Bo
- House of Dinajara
- Nayaks of Kandy

=== Thailand ===
- Chakri dynasty
- Thai monarchs' family tree

=== Turkey ===
- Ottoman sultans simplified
- Ottoman sultans more detailed
- Ottoman princes today (Osmanoğlu family)

==== Classical Anatolia ====
- Hittite
- Lysimachid
- Cappadocia
- Pontus
- Pergamon
- Bithynia

==== Turkic sultans ====
- Seljuk (Anatolian Seljuk)
- Ghaznavid
- Anushtiginid

=== Vietnam ===
- Vietnamese monarchs

=== Arabian Peninsula ===
- House of Saud (rulers of Saudi Arabia)
- House of Al-Sabah (emirs of Kuwait)
- House of Thani (emirs of Qatar)
- House of Al Bu Said (sultans of Oman)
- House of Nahyan (Sheikhs of Abu Dhabi)
- House of Maktoum (Sheikhs of Dubai)
- House of Al Qasimi (Sheikhs of Sharjah and Ras Al Khaimah)

=== Other ===
- Spartocids (Kingdom of the Bosporus)
- Bhutto family (modern Pakistan)

== Africa ==
=== Egypt ===
- First Dynasty
- Fourth Dynasty
- Eleventh Dynasty
- Twelfth Dynasty
- Eighteenth Dynasty
- Nineteenth Dynasty
- Twentieth Dynasty
- Twenty-first Dynasty
- Twenty-sixth Dynasty
- Ptolemy's family tree (Macedonian Egypt)
- Muhammad Ali Dynasty

=== Ethiopia ===
- Ethiopian emperors

=== Madagascar ===
- Imerina

=== Tunisia ===
- Husainid dynasty

=== Zanzibar ===
- Sultans of Zanzibar

=== South Africa ===
- Xhosa
- Zulu

== Europe ==
=== Ancient Rome ===
==== Aristocratic families ====
- The Aurelii Cottae
- The Caecilii Metellii
- The Cornelii Scipiones
- The Julii Caesares
- The Marcii Philippi
- The Octavii Rufi (paternal family of Augustus)
- the Patrician Claudii (paternal family of Emperors Tiberius, Caligula, and Claudius)
- the Claudii Marcelli (the most famous plebeian branch of the Claudii)

==== Imperial dynasties ====
- Roman Emperors family tree (collection of simplified Imperial Roman family trees)
- Julio-Claudian dynasty (27 BC – 68 AD)
- Flavian dynasty (69 – 117 AD)
- Nerva–Antonine dynasty (96 – 192 AD)
- Severan dynasty (193 – 235 AD)
- Constantinian dynasty (305 – 383 AD)
- Valentinianic dynasty (364 – 392 AD)

=== Armenia ===
- Orondid

=== Austria ===
- Babenberger Family Tree
- Von Graben family (Austrian)
- Habsburg family (Austrian)
- House of Habsburg
- Hitler family

=== Belgium ===
- Dukes of Brabant
- Counts of Flanders
- Counts and dukes of Guelders
- Counts of Hainaut
- Kings of Belgium, in French, List in French

=== Bohemia ===
- Kings of Bohemia family tree
- Přemyslid dynasty and Premyslid Dynasty Family Tree (picture)

=== Bosnia ===
==== Royal ====
- Boričević dynasty
- Kings of Bosnia

==== Noble families ====
- Hrvatinić noble family
- Kosača noble family
- Radinović-Pavlović noble family
- Radojević-Mirković noble family
- Zlatonosović noble family
- Dinjčića-Kovačević noble family
- Sanković noble family
- Radivojević noble family
- Nikolić noble family
- Miloradović noble family
- Ljubibratić noble family
- Branivojević noble family

=== Bulgaria ===
- Krum's dynasty
- Cometopuli dynasty
- Asen dynasty
- Terter dynasty
- Shishman dynasty

=== Croatia ===
- Princes of Bribir
- Princes of Krk
- Princes of Zrin
- Trpimirović Royal Family

=== France ===
==== Royals ====
- Kings of France
- Kings of France (simple) (includes Merovingians, Carolingians, and Capetians)
- Emperors of the French (House of Bonaparte)
- Kings of Navarre
- House of Bourbon (simplified)
- Genealogy of Descent of the Bourbons from Henry IV
- House of Blois Counts of Blois, Champagne, Sancerre, Boulogne, Aumale, Kings of Navarre, King of England

==== Noble Houses ====
- Ingelgeriens (en), counts of Anjou, ancestors of the Plantagenets
- House of Châteaudun, viconts of Châteaudun and counts of Perche, direct ancestors of the Plantagenets.
- Rorgonides, ancestors of the House of Châteaudun
- House of Baux - Lords of Baux
- House of La Fayette - Motier de la Fayette, called "Lafayette"
- House of Rohan-Chabot
- House of Bourbon (French)
- Genealogy of the direct Capetians (fr)
- Genealogy of the Royal House of France (fr)
- Capetian House of Courtenay
- Family Tree of the Valois, Medicis and Bourbons (French)
- Family Tree of the Bourbons to Henry IV (French)
- Relationships of dynasties to the Bourbons (French)
- House of Anjou-Sicily, Counts of Provence, Kings of Naples, Kings of Hungary (simple) and (detailed)

==== Princes ====
- Princes of Conde
- Princes of Conti

==== Dukes and Counts ====
- Dukes of Aquitaine
- Dukes of Brittany and (in French)
- Dukes of Burgundy
- Duke of Normandy (picture), and House of Normandy (chart)
- Dukes of Lorraine
- Counts of Provence

=== Georgia ===
- Kings of Iberia
- Kings of Georgia
- Kings of Kartli
- Kings of Kakheti
- Kings of Imereti

=== Germany ===
==== Royal ====
- German monarchs family tree (843–1918)
- Merovingian dynasty
- Kings of Germany (Carolingian, Ottonian, Salian and Hohenstaufen dynasties) (picture)
- Habsburg family (Austrian)
- Habsburg Family Tree
- House of Wittelsbach (Kings and Dukes of Bavaria, Electoral Counts Palatine of the Rhine, Counts of Holland)
- House of Luxembourg, counts and dukes of Luxembourg, kings of Bohemia, and German Emperors
- House of Welf Kings of Burgundy, Dukes of Bavaria, Saxony & Brunswick, Electors & Kings of Hanover, branch of the House of Este
- Genealogy of the House of Welf
- Genealogy List of the House of Hesse (German)
- Counts and dukes of Guelders
- House of Wettin, Dukes, Electors & Kings of Saxony
- Saxe-Coburg and Gotha

==== Dukes ====
- Dukes of Swabia (House of Hohenstaufen)
- Dukes of Lorraine

==== Others ====
- Bach family important in the history of music for nearly two hundred years, with several notable composers, the best-known of whom was Johann Sebastian Bach
- Rothschild family

=== Greece ===
- Atreus - House of Atreus - of the Greek Heroic age, family of Agamemnon and Menelaus
- Erechtheid dynasty mythological kings of Athens, also here
- Heraclidae Kings of Sparta
- Argead Dynasty, family of Philip II of Macedonia and Alexander the Great
- Kings of the Hellenes
- Kings of the Hellenes, simple (French)
- Alcmaeonids noble house of Ancient Athens, family of Pericles and Alcibiades
- Byzantine emperors family tree

=== Hungary ===
- Kings of Hungary family tree

=== Ireland ===
- Uí Fiachrach (Irish)
- Uí Néill (Irish)
- Uí Ímair
- Northern Uí Néill

=== Italy ===
- Neapolitan monarchs
- Sicilian monarchs
- Visconti Family, Dukes of Milan
- Sforza Family, Dukes of Milan
- Farnese, Dukes of Parma
- Gonzaga Family, Marquesses and Dukes of Mantua
- House of Este and here, duke of Ferrara, Modena, and Reggio
- House of Savoy (in Italian) or here (in French)
- House of Medici
- Borgia family
- Della Rovere

=== Luxembourg ===
- Grand Ducal Family of Luxembourg

=== Monaco ===
- Princes of Monaco
- House of Grimaldi

=== Netherlands ===
- Monarchs of the Netherlands
- Princes of Orange and Kings/Queens of the Netherlands or here
- Dukes of Brabant
- Counts of Flanders
- Counts and dukes of Guelders
- Counts of Holland
- Counts of Hainaut
- House of De Graeff family tree

=== Poland ===
- Family tree of Polish monarchs
- Piast
- Piast-Silesia
- Jagiellon

=== Portugal ===
- Kings of Portugal
- Descent of Present Duke of Braganza

=== Romania ===
- Romanian Royal House - Hohenzollern-Sigmaringen

=== Russia ===
- Rulers of Russia family tree
- Summary Family Tree of the Romanov dynasty

=== Serbia ===
- Karađorđević family tree and here
- Nemanjić family tree
- Crnojević family tree
- Balšić family tree
- Branković family tree
- Lazarević family tree
- Vojislavljević family tree
- Vlastimirović family tree

=== Scandinavia ===
- Kings of Denmark
  - Present Danish Royal Family
  - House of Knýtlinga ("House of Cnut's Descendants" but known in Denmark as house of Gorm the Old)
  - House of Estridsen
  - Royal descendants of Queen Victoria and King Christian IX
  - Oldenborg dynasty family tree (in Czech), shows relationships between branches of Oldenburg dynasty, i.e. the Kings of Denmark, the Czars of Russia, Kings of Sweden, the Kings of Greece, the Kings of Norway.
  - Dukes of Holstein=Gottrop (Oldenburg)
  - Canute the Great's family tree
- Kings of Norway family tree
  - Modern Norwegian Royal Family
- Kings of Sweden
  - Kings of Sweden of the House of Vasa
  - Kings of Sweden of the House of Bernadotte
- Ynglings - semi-legendary clan supposed progenitor of the Fairhairs and the Munsö

=== Spain ===
- Kings of Spain
- Kings of Aragon
- Kings of Asturias
- Kings of Castile
- Kings of Leon
- Kings of Navarre
- Visigothic Kingdom
- Counts of Barcelona and Kings of Aragon (simple)
- House of Trastámara
- All kings of all Spanish kingdoms

=== United Kingdom ===
- House of Wessex, Kings of England and House of Wessex from Alfred
- Kings of Northumbria
- Kings of Mercia
- Kings of East Anglia (519–749)
- Kings of Scotland (834–1603)
- Princes of Wales (c. 450 – 1719)
  - House of Aberffraw, Princes of Wales
- United Kingdom Kings
  - House of Godwin
  - Normans, Plantagenets, House of York, House of Lancaster, House of Tudor (simplified version) (1066–1603)
  - Plantagenet family tree (simple)
  - Edward III's claim to the French throne
  - Lancasters and Yorks in the Wars of the Roses
    - House of Lancaster from 1267-1471 (simple) and (French)
    - House of York from 1341-1485 (simple) and (French)
    - Houses of Lancaster and York during the Wars of the Roses
    - House of Beaufort, dukes of Somerset, cadet branch of the house of Lancaster
    - Somerset family tree: Earls & Marquesses of Worcester, Dukes of Beaufort (illegitimate Plantagenets)
    - Holland Family, earls and dukes of Kent and Exeter and their connections
  - House of Tudor and the Wars of the Roses (simplified)
  - House of Tudor and Plantagenet showing relationship with Cromwells
  - House of Stuart, House of Hanover, House of Windsor (1603–now)
    - Jacobite succession (clickable) Jacobite succession (picture)
    - Royal descendants of Queen Victoria and King Christian IX
    - Family Tree of Stewart/Stuart Family
    - Family Tree of Stewart of Darnley and Dukes of Lennox
    - Family Tree of Stuart Dukes of Albany
    - Family Tree of Dukes of Richmond
    - Family Tree of Marquesses of Bute
    - FitzAlan Family, Earls of Arundel and their relationship to the Stuarts.
    - Family Tree of Earls of Munster
  - Family tree of the British royal family
- House of Tudor Patrimonial/Welsh Lineage
- House of Bebbanburgh ealdorman and high-reeve of Bebbanburgh (now Bamburgh)
- Howard family, Dukes of Norfolk (picture) and Dukes of Norfolk (clickable)
- de Clare, descendants of Richard I, Duke of Normandy's, Earls of Pembroke, Glamorgan, Hertford and Gloucester, etc.
- House of de Vere, earls of Oxford
- House of Courtenay, Earls of Devon and here (clickable)
- House of Neville(en) and (fr) herewith tree, earls of Westmorland, Warwick, Bergavenny, etc.
- House of Percy, Earls of Northumberland, Dukes of Northumberland, "Kings in the North"
- Le Despenser Family barons le Despenser, earls of Winchester, Despenser(in Italian)
- Dukes of Marlborough from the Churchill and Spencer family
- Spencer Modern (in Italian) and Spencer Peers (in Italian)
- Hamilton dukes of Abercorn and dukes of Hamilton
- Herbert family, earls of Pembroke, Carnarvon, and Powis, Barons Herbert, Baron Herbert of Chirbury, Earl of Torrington
- Cecil, Earls and Marquesses of Salisbury
- Earls and Dukes of Portland from the Bentinck family
- Earls of Lincoln and Dukes of Newcastle
- Leveson-Gower & Egerton Family Tree: Earls Gower, Marquesses of Stafford, Dukes of Sutherland
- Rich family, earls of Warwick
- Fox family earls of Ilchester
- Barons Byron (family of the poet Lord Byron)
- Charles Darwin's family
- J.R.R. Tolkien's family
- Keynes family
- Astor family (U.K. peerage/U.S. politics)
- Barton/Hack family
- Birley family
- Dummer family
- Robin Fox acting family
- Inglis family
- Pares family
- Thwaites family (brewers)
- Veitch family (nurserymen)

== Oceania ==
=== Hawaii ===
- Kamehameha
- Lunalilo
- Kalākaua

=== French Polynesia ===
- Huahine
- Mangareva
- Tahiti
- Bora Bora

=== Samoa ===
- Malietoa
- Tui Manua
- Tupua Tamasese
- Anoaʻi (professional wrestling)

=== Tonga ===
- Tonga

== Religious ==
=== Abrahamic religions ===
- Abraham's family tree

==== Biblical (from Adam to Jesus) ====
- Family tree of the Bible
  - Descendants of Cain and Seth (from Adam and Eve to the sons of Noah)
  - Abraham's family tree (from Noah to the sons of Jacob)
  - Descendants of Levi and ancestry of Moses
  - Israelites
    - List of high priests of Israel
    - Twelve Tribes of Israel
  - Ancestry of David
    - Davidic dynasty (from David to Solomon)
      - Kings of Israel and Judah
  - Family tree of the Macabees (Hasmonean dynasty)
  - Herodian dynasty
  - Genealogy of Jesus

==== Islamic (descendants of Muhammad and his companions) ====
- Muhammad ibn 'Abdullah
- Abu-Bakr ibn Abi-Quhafah
- 'Umar ibn Al-Khattab
- 'Uthman ibn 'Affan
- 'Ali ibn Abi-Talib
- Family tree of Husayn ibn Ali and the Twelve Imams
  - List of Husaynidic dynasties in the Muslim world
- Umayyad family
- Hashemite family (current rulers of Jordan)
- Alaouite dynasty (current rulers of Morocco)
- Husainid dynasty (former rulers of Tunisia)

==== Latter Day Saints ====
- Family tree of Joseph Smith
  - Children of Joseph Smith
  - List of descendants of Joseph Smith Sr. and Lucy Mack Smith
- List of Book of Mormon groups
  - Amlicites
  - Ishmaelites
  - Jaredites
  - Lamanites
    - Anti-Nephi-Lehies
  - Mulekites
    - Zarahemla
  - Nephites
    - Amalekites
  - Zoramites

=== Polytheistic ===
- Sumerian gods
- Babylonian gods
- Greek gods
- Japanese kami
- Māori gods
- Norse gods

== Fictional ==
=== Tolkien ===
High-elf

- House of Olwë, Elwë (Thingol), and Elmo

Half-elven

- Line of the Half-elven

Dwarf

- Durin's Folk family tree

=== Other ===
From books, movies, or TV series

- Niebelung genealogy the Nibelungenlied
- House of Telmar family tree - Chronicles of Narnia
- McDuck family tree - Donald Duck
- Ewing family tree - Dallas
- Crawley of Downton Abbey family tree
- Skywalker family tree - Star Wars
- Forsyte family tree - The Forsytes

A Song of Ice and Fire (Book)

- House Stark family tree
- House Lannister family tree

One Life to Live (TV series)

- Buchanan family tree
- Cramer family tree
- Lord family tree
- Riley family tree
- Wolek family tree

General Hospital (TV series)

- Corinthos family
- Cassadine family
- Hardy/Webber family
- Jerome family
- Quartermaine family
- Scorpio/Jones family
- Spencer family

Jin Yong's books

- Yang Guo's family tree - Condor Trilogy
- Guo Jing's family tree - Condor Trilogy
- Zhang Wuji's family tree - Condor Trilogy
- Lin Pingzhi's family tree - The Smiling, Proud Wanderer

== See also ==
- Lists of office-holders
