= Sebastian II Grabner zu Rosenburg =

Nobleman of the Archduchy of Austria

Sebastian II Grabner zu Rosenburg und Pottenbrunn (16th century – 1610), also Sebastian von Grabner or Sebastian Grabner the Younger, was a nobleman of the Archduchy of Austria under the Enns.

== Biography ==
Sebastian Grabner was the son of Leopold Grabner zu Rosenburg from the second Lower Austrian line of the Grabner zu Rosenburg of the extensive Herren von Graben family and Freiin Ehrentraud von Königsberg. He followed his father as lord of Rosenburg, Pottenbrunn, Siebenbrunn, Judenau, Schlickendorf in Lower Austria and Joslowitz in Moravia. During the 16th and early 17th centuries, the Grabners were among the richest and most respected families in Austria, and among the leading Protestant noble families in the country, and therefore in opposition to the Habsburgs.

Sebastian Grabner's first marriage was to Johanna von Polheim (born 14 June 1561, died 15 June 1593), daughter of Maximilian von Polheim und Wartenberg (born 1525, died 20 April 1570) and Judith von Weißpriach (died 5 November 1578). They had four children among other Johann Leopold and Friedrich Christoph, the last of the Grabners zu Rosenburg. No descendants were born to him from his second marriage to Margaretha (Marusch) von Zelking.

During the Reformation, Sebastian Grabner was one of the country's leading Protestants. Between the years 1593 and 1597 he converted the Rosenburg castle into a magnificent Renaissance palace. Most of the Gothic Rosenburg was demolished and the castle was reconstructed in Renaissance style with 13 towers. He was also responsible for the reconstruction of Pottenbrunn palace. In 1608 Grabner together with his elder son Johann Leopold Grabner zu Rosenburg a signatory of the Protestant Horner Bund. In 1609 and 1610 he was a deputy of the Protestant estates of Lower Austria, sat on the committee for religious freedom that they demanded and was therefore also involved in diplomatic negotiations with Emperor Matthias.

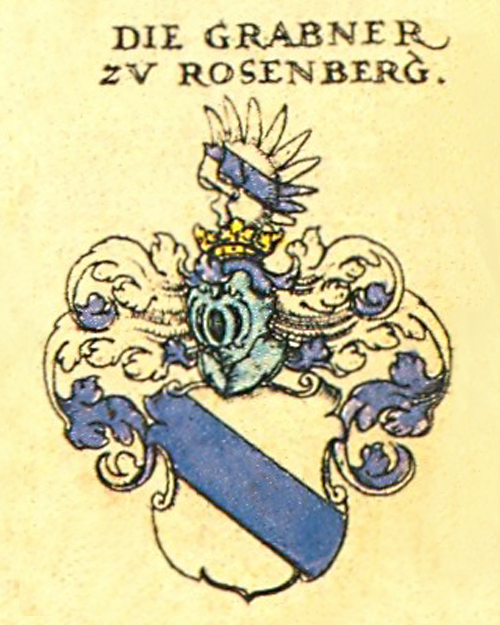
Wappen der Grabner zu Rosenberg (Rosenburg)

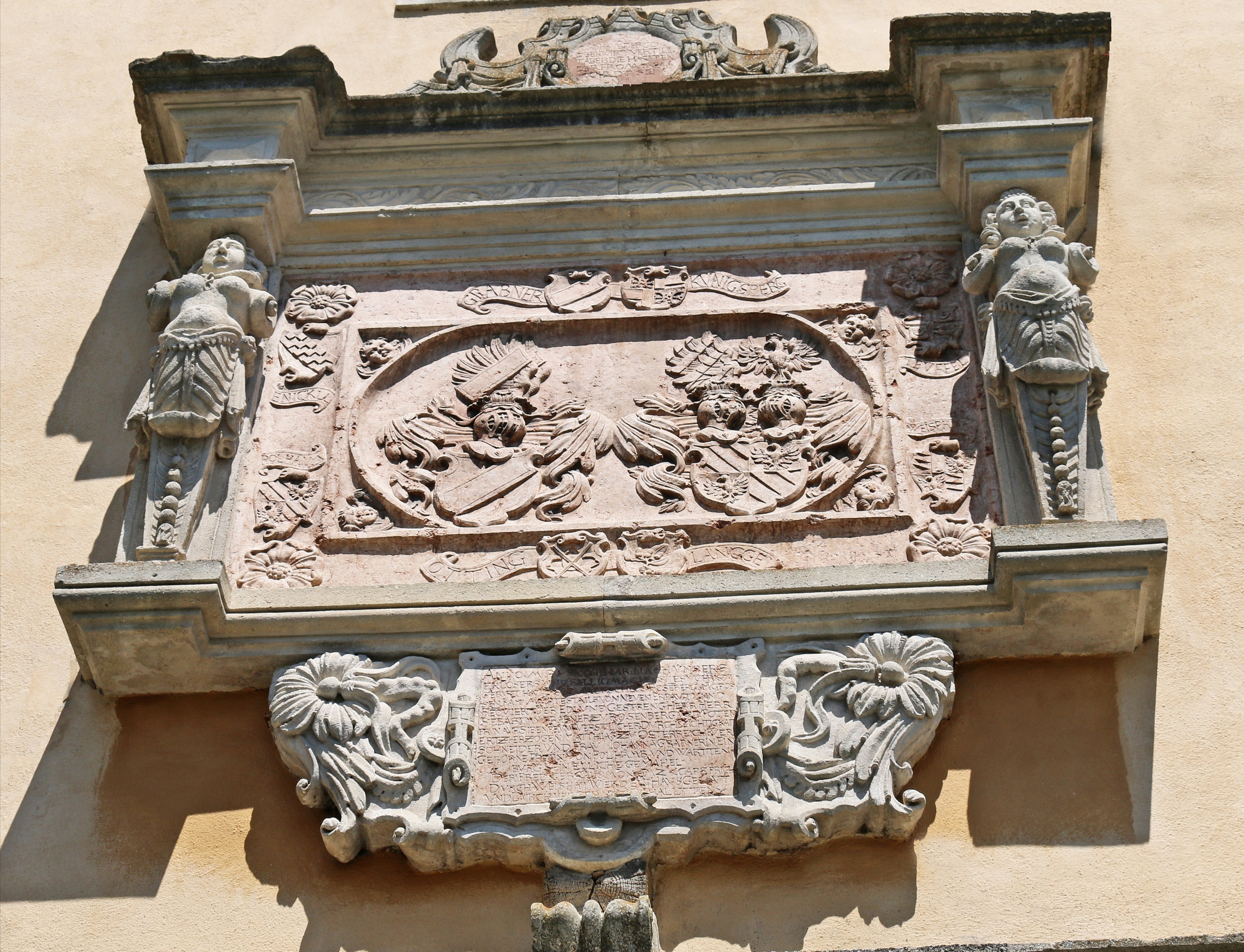
Coat of arms Grabner and Polheim at the Rosenburg portal

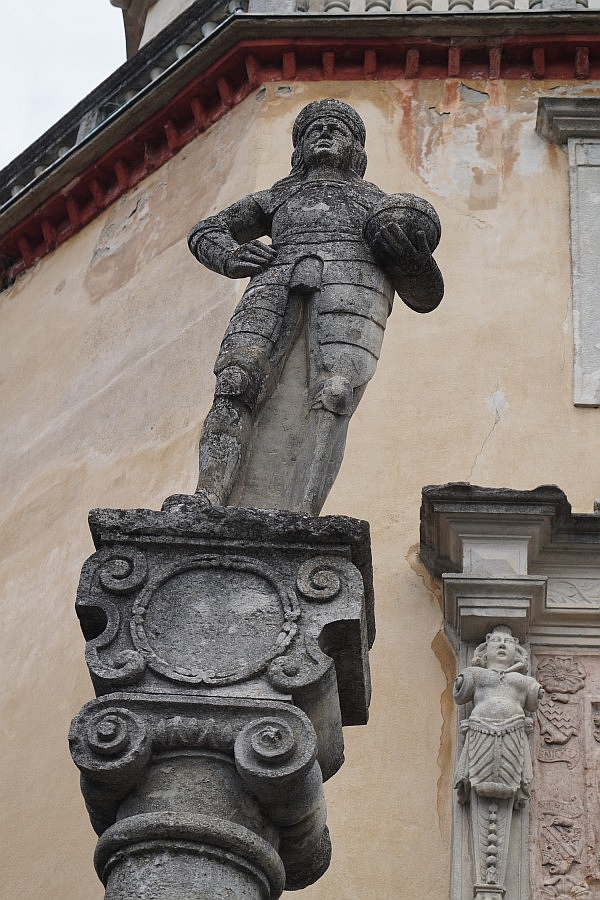
Statue of Sebastian Grabner on the Rosenburg
