= Von Graben family tree =

This is the family tree of the Austrian Von Graben family. Originally from Carniola, the House Von Graben is an apparent (or illegitimate) branch of the House of Meinhardin. The family went on to rule some Carinthian, Tyrolian, East Tyrols, modern Italian, Styrian, and Gorizian districts as Burggrafen (a sort of Viscounts) and Lords (Herren) from the early Middle Ages until the 16th–17th century.

== Family tree ==
=== Old branch of the family ===
1. Conrad vom Graben (named 1170–1208)
2. Grisold vom Graben (named 1170)
  1. Walter vom Graben (named 1170)

... →

1. Rapoto vom Graben (named 1203)
2. Rudolph ab dem Graben (named 1222)

... →

=== From 13th to 18th century ===
1. Konrad I vom (ab dem) Graben († 1307; unknown parents)
  1. Konrad II vom (ab dem) Graben [Grabner] († before 1356)
    1. → Rosenberger; later house of Orsini-Rosenberg
    2. Otto Grabner (named 1314/28) → Lower Austrian branch
      1. Heinrich Grabner (named 1325)
        1. Hanns Grabner (named 1360)
          1. Jacob der Grabner, the older (named 1354)
            1. Jacob Grabner, the younger (named 1410)
              1. Otto Grabner (named 1440)
                1. Johann (Hans) Grabner, the younger (named 1449–1481)
                2. Georg Grabner auf Joslowitz (named 1450; † 1487)
                  1. Christoph Grabner zu Rosenburg (named 1487–1515)
                    1. Sebastian I Grabner zu Rosenburg (named since 1508, † 1535)
                      1. Georg Grabner zu Rosenburg und Zagging (* before or around 1510; † 1562)
                        1. Wilhelm Grabner zu Rosenburg
                        2. Elisabeth Grabner zu Rosenburg
                      2. Elisabeth Grabner zu Rosenburg
                      3. Christoph Grabner zu Rosenburg
                      4. Hedwig Grabner zu Rosenburg
                      5. Margaretha Grabner zu Rosenburg
                      6. Rosina Grabner zu Rosenburg
                      7. Leopold Grabner zu Rosenburg (1528–1583)
                        1. Sebastian II Grabner zu Rosenburg († 1610)
                          1. Esther Sophia Grabner von (zu) Rosenburg
                          2. Maria Grabner von (zu) Rosenburg (1589–1623)
                          3. Johann Leopold Grabner zu Rosenburg († ca 1613)
                          4. Friedrich Christoph Grabner zu Rosenburg († around 1650)
                        2. Jakob Grabner zu Rosenburg
                        3. Friedrich Grabner zu Rosenburg
                        4. Christoph Grabner zu Rosenburg
                        5. Hanns Georg Grabner zu Rosenburg
                        6. Wilhelm Grabner zu Rosenburg
                        7. Sophia Grabner zu Rosenburg
                        8. Esther Grabner zu Rosenburg
                        9. Maria Grabner zu Rosenburg
                        10. Katharina Grabner zu Rosenburg
                        11. Johanna Grabner zu Rosenburg
                        12. Petronilla Grabner zu Rosenburg
                        13. Johann Grabner zu Rosenburg
                        14. Veronica Grabner zu Rosenburg
                        15. Josaphat Grabner zu Rosenburg († 1564)
                        16. Jacob Grabner zu Rosenburg († 1552)
                  2. Jakob Grabner zu Rosenburg (named 1487; † 1502)
                  3. Margareta Grabner († 1499)
                3. Andreas Grabner († 1449)
        2. Georg Grabner (named 1368)
          1. Hans Grabner, the older (named 1387)
    3. Jakob Grabner (named 1328)
  2. Reinprecht II vom (ab dem) Graben († before 1356)
  3. Heinzlein [Heinrich] vom (ab dem) Graben (named 1325–1363)
  4. Niclein vom (ab dem) Graben († after 1403)
2. Rennewart vom (ab dem) Graben (named 1294)
3. Walther vom (ab dem) Graben († before 1331) → Thaler branch (Styria)
  1. N. von Thal (named 1307)
    1. Fritzel der Grabner (named 1341)
  2. Reinprecht III vom (ab dem) Graben, the older († before 1413)
    1. Affra vom (ab dem) Graben († before 1458)
  3. Chuntz [Conrad] vom (ab dem) Graben (named 1410)
  4. Anna vom (ab dem) Graben (named 1431)
  5. Georg vom (ab dem) Graben († 1439)
    1. Ulrich [Ullein] vom (ab dem) Graben († ca 1456)
    2. Reinprecht IV vom (ab dem) Graben, the younger (named 1396–1456)
    3. Wolfgang vom (ab dem) Graben (named 1456)
4. Ulrich I von Graben († before 1325) → Kornberger branch (Styria)
  1. Veit von Graben († short after 1300)
  2. Martin (Mört) von (im) Graben (named 1366)
  3. Otto I. von Graben († before 1360)
    1. Heinrich von Graben († unknown, after 1360)
    2. Elisabeth von Graben (named ca 1360)
    3. Beata von Graben (named 1409)
    4. Friedrich von Graben
    5. Wolfgang von Graben
    6. Veronica von Graben
    7. Barbara von Graben
    8. Dorothea von Graben
  4. Ulrich II von Graben (named 1300–1361)
  5. Friedrich I von Graben (* ca 1300; † before 1404)
    1. Friedrich II von Graben (* before or around 1379; † before 1463)
      1. Dorothea von Graben († 1519)
      2. Wolfgang von Graben († before 1468)
      3. Ulrich III von Graben (1415–1486)
        1. Wolfgang von Graben († 1521)
          1. Peter von Graben a.k.a. Pieter (de) Graeff (born around 1450/1460) → family (De) Graeff
        2. Andree von Graben († 1521)
        3. Georg von Graben († 1522)
        4. Rosina von Graben
        5. Margret [Marusch] von Graben (named 1500)
        6. Elisabeth von Graben (named 1483)
        7. Wilhelm von Graben († 1523)
          1. Georg Siegmund von Graben († 1543)
          2. Andrä von Graben († 1556)
          3. Margreta von Graben (named 1534)
          4. Anna von Graben († 1564)
      4. Reinprecht V von Graben named between 1456 and 1493)
    2. Anna von Graben (named 1415)
    3. Agnes von Graben (named 1380–1447)
    4. Dorothea von Graben (named 1439)
    5. female unknown (named 1459)
    6. female unknown unbekannt (named 1409)
    7. Leonhard [Lienhart, Linhart] von Graben (named 1441) → first line in Tyrol
      1. descendants until 1519
    8. Andreas von Graben († 1463) → Sommeregg line (Carinthia)
      1. Heinrich von Graben († 1507)
        1. [?] Christof von Graben (named 1543–1578)
        2. [?] Andreas II von Graben († 1560)
      2. Ernst von Graben († 1513)
        1. Rosina von Graben von Rain († 1534)
      3. Virgil von Graben († 1507)
        1. Christof von Graben (named 1498)
        2. Lukas von Graben zum Stein († 1550) → line am Stein (Carinthia, East-Tyrol)
          1. Margaretha von Graben zum Stein (named 1542)
          2. N von Graben zum Stein
          3. Catharina von Graben zum Stein (named 1540)
          4. Hans von Graben zum Stein, the older († 1587/91)
            1. Barbara von Graben zum Stein († 1580)
            2. Hans von Graben zum Stein, the younger († 1593)
              1. Maria von Graben zum Stein (named 1569)
              2. Georg von Graben zum Stein (named 1568)
              3. Sabina von Graben zum Stain und Thurn (named 1565)
              4. Johann von Graben zum Stein
              5. Christoph von Graben zum Stein (named 1564)
                1. Benigna von Graben zum Stein
                2. Maria von Graben zum Stein
                3. Ursula von Graben zum Stein
                4. Barbara von Graben zum Stein
                5. Catharina von Graben zum Stein
                6. Johanna von Graben zum Stein
              6. Oswald von Graben zum Stein († 1609)
                1. Anna Christina von Graben zum Stein
              7. Christina von Graben zum Stein
              8. Andreas von Graben zum Stein
              9. Sigismund von Graben zum Stein
              10. Ursula Virgo von Graben zum Stein
              11. Salome von Graben zum Stein
            3. Virgil von Graben zum Stain (named 1558–1570)
            4. Christoph von Graben zum Stein (named 1575)
            5. Georg von Graben zum Stein (named 1575)
            6. Catharina von Graben zum Stein (named 1577)
            7. Elisabeth von Graben zum Stein
          5. Georg von Graben zum Stein († 1595)
        3. Barthlmä von Graben → second Tyrolian line
          1. unknown
            1. Christof von Graben (1596-1628)
              1. Christof David von Graben zum Stein († 1664)
              2. Anna Juliana von Graben zum Stein
              3. Lukretia von Graben zum Stein
              4. Ursula von Graben zum Stein
            2. Christina von Graben
            3. Susanna von Graben
        4. Georg von Graben → third Tyrolean line
          1. male unknown
            1. male unknown
              1. male unknown
                1. (not sure) male unknown
                  1. Johann Andre (Hans Andreas) von Graben
                    1. Martin Laurenz von Graben
                    2. Maria Juliana von Graben
                  2. Hans [Johann] Karl von Graben
                    1. Otto Heinrich von Graben [zum Stein] (* 1643)
                      1. (not sure) Otto von Graben zum Stein (1690–1756)
                    2. Johann Sigismund von Graben [zum Stein]
                      1. (not sure) Felix Jakob von Graben († 1776/1780)
                  3. Apollonia von Graben
                  4. Carl von Graben (?)
        5. Virgil Lucz von Graben (named 1550)
          1. Bartholomeus von Graben (named 1525–1564)
            1. Michael von Graben
          2. Leonhard (Lienhard) von Graben (named 1507–1545)
          3. Andreas von Graben (named 1527–1574)
            1. male unknown
              1. (Anna) Maria von Graben (named 1575)
              2. Regina von Graben
        6. bastard
        7. bastard
        8. bastard
        9. bastard
      4. Ruth von Graben (named 1477)
      5. Cosmas von Graben († 1479)
      6. Wolfgang von Graben (named 1450)
      7. Wolfgang Andreas (Wolf Andrä) von Graben (named 1486)
      8. Barbara von Graben (named 1467)
    9. Crescentia von Graben (named 1434-1441)
  6. Nikolaus von Graben (genannt 1350/56) → line in Lower Austria
    1. Dietrich (Dietl) von Graben (named ca 1400)
    2. Otto II von Graben (* 1378; † 1439)
    3. Friedrich (Friedl) von Graben
    4. Wolfgang von Graben (named 1405 - 1421)
    5. Veronika von Graben (* 1404)
    6. Agnes Veronika von Graben (* 1406)
  7. Catrey von Graben
  8. Johann von Graben (genannt 1350)
  9. Heinrich von (in den) Graben (named 1356)
  10. Martin (Mört) von (im) Graben (named 1366)

==== Other members ====
- Hermann and Burkhard von Graben, brothers (named 1284)
- Adelheid von Graben (named mid 14th century)
- Otto von Graben (named 1379)
- Ulrich, Conrad, Heinrich and Otto von Graben, brothers (named 1374)
- Anastasia von Graben (15th century)
- Catharina von Graben, daughter of a Wolfgang von Graben (16th century)
- Dorothea von Graben zum Stein (16th century)
- Anna Regina von Graben (17th century)
- Maria Ignatia von Graben (17th century)
- Johann von Graben zum Stein (17th century)
- Cäcilia von Graben (18th century)

== See also ==
- Von Graben

== Literature ==
- Hermann Wiesflecker: Die Grafschaft Görz und die Herrschaft Lienz, ihre Entwicklung und ihr Erbfall an Österreich (1500) Digitalisiert als PDF
- Adalbert Sikora: Die Herren vom Graben in Zeitschrift des historischen Vereines für Steiermark. 51. Jahrgang, Graz 1960
- Rudolf Granichstaedten-Czerva (1948): Brixen – Reichsfürstentum und Hofstaat.
- Joseph August Kumar: Mahlerische Streifzüge in den Umgebungen der Hauptstadt Grätz – Grätz ., Kapitel XIII Rosenberg und Graben (S. 265-300) Digitalisiert bei Google books
- Johann Weichard Freiherr von Valvasor (1689): Die Ehre dess Hertzogthums Crain: das ist, Wahre, gründliche, und recht eigendliche Belegen- und Beschaffenheit dieses Römisch-Keyserlichen herrlichen Erblandes; Laybach (Ljubljana)
