= Leopold Grabner zu Rosenburg =

Austrian nobleman

Leopold Grabner zu Rosenburg, Pottenbrunn and Siebenbrunn (born probably 1528 at Rosenburg castle; died 1583 ibid), also Leopold Grabner (zu Rosenburg), during his lifetime Leopold Grabner zu Rosenberg, was a nobleman of the Archduchy of Austria below the Enns. During the Reformation, Grabner was one of the leading Protestants in the country, a deputy of the estates and councillor. Under him, Rosenburg castle became a center of Austrian Reformation history.

== Biography ==
=== Family ===
Leopold Grabner was the son of Sebastian I Grabner zu Rosenburg from the Grabner zu Rosenburg line of the Herren von Graben family and Sophia Ennenkel, sister of Achatz II von Ennenkel. During the 16th and early 17th centuries, the Grabners were among the richest and most respected families in Austria.

=== Feudal lord and politician ===
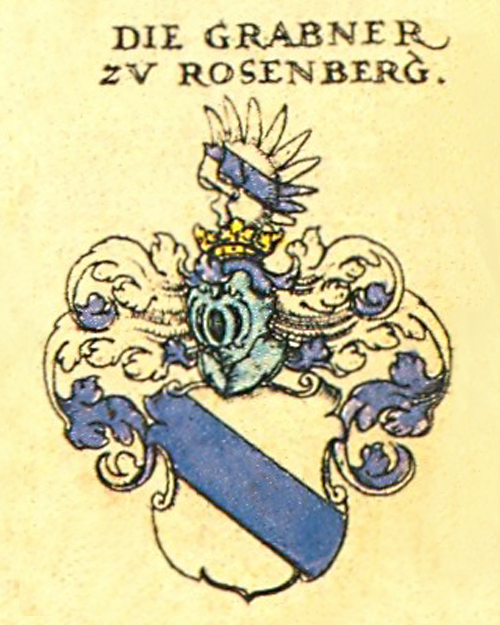
Coat of arms Grabner zu Rosenberg (Rosenburg)

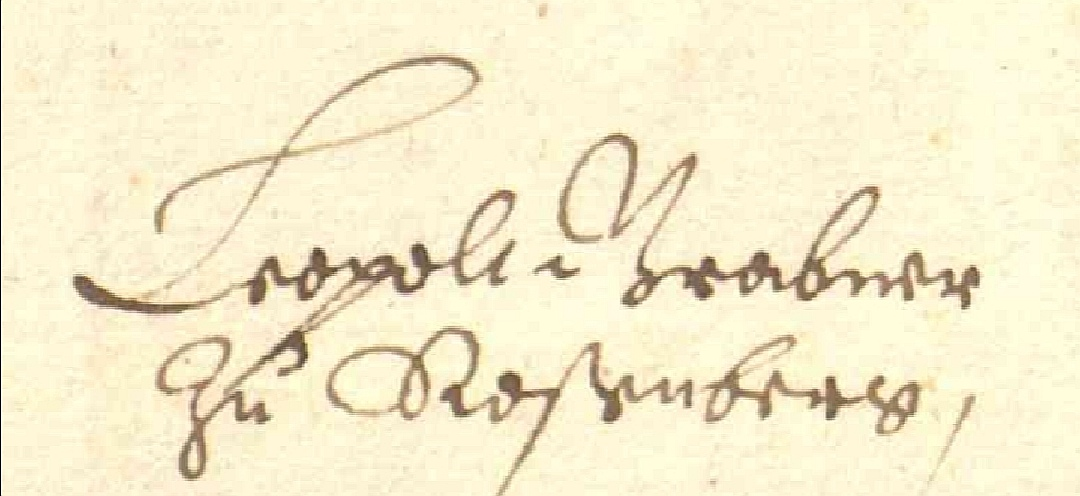
Signature Leopold Grabner zu Rosenburg

Leopold Grabner, together with his older halfbrother Josaphat Grabner zu Rosenburg, inherited the Rosenburg Lordship in 1535 from their father. 1562, after the death of his older halfbrother Georg Grabner zu Rosenburg und Zagging, whose only son Wilhelm died early and who otherwise left behind his daughter Elisabeth, he inherited the Lordship Pottenbrunn. Leopold Grabner also held the titles as Lord of Siebenbrunn, Judenau, Schlickendorf in Lower Austria and Joslowitz in Moravia. In the course of the 16th century, he and his family came into opposition to the Habsburgs, rulers of Lower Austria, because of their active promotion of Protestantism. At the Rosenburg he set up a printing press specifically to print Protestant literature. Between 1567 and 1570 Leopold Grabner was appointed a member of parliament by the Lower Austrian knighthood. In 1569, along with Rüdiger von Starhemberg and Wolf Christoph von Enzersdorf, he was a (religious) deputy on the part of the Protestant Austrian estates, in order to deal with the management and constitution of the Protestant religious system with the theologian David Chytraeus, as well as to regulate the church agenda. He then became Emperor Maximilian II's court chamber councilor for Lower Austria. In 1571 Grabner worked in the committee of the Lower Austrian estates, also in the committee of the state defense regulations. He held his position as religious representative of the estates until his death in 1583. His eldest son Sebastian II Grabner zu Rosenburg became his successor in the various Lordships.

== Literature ==
- Melanchthons Briefwechsel, Kritische und kommentierte Gesamtausgabe, Im Auftrag der Heidelberger Akademie der Wissenschaften; Verlag frommann-holzboog (Stuttgart-Bad Cannstatt 2005); herausgegeben von Heinz Scheible. Band 12, Personen F–K, p 170 - Book search online
