= Donaudorf =

Donaudorf may refer to several places in Austria:

- a cadastral community in Gedersdorf, Lower Austria
- a cadastral community in the municipal Ybbs an der Donau, Melk District Lower Austria
