= Georg Grabner zu Rosenburg und Zagging =

Georg Grabner zu Rosenburg und Zagging (* before or around 1510 at Rosenburg Castle; † 1562 probably at Zagging Castle) was a nobleman of the Archduchy of Austria under the Enns in the age of the Reformation.

== Life ==
=== Background and family ===
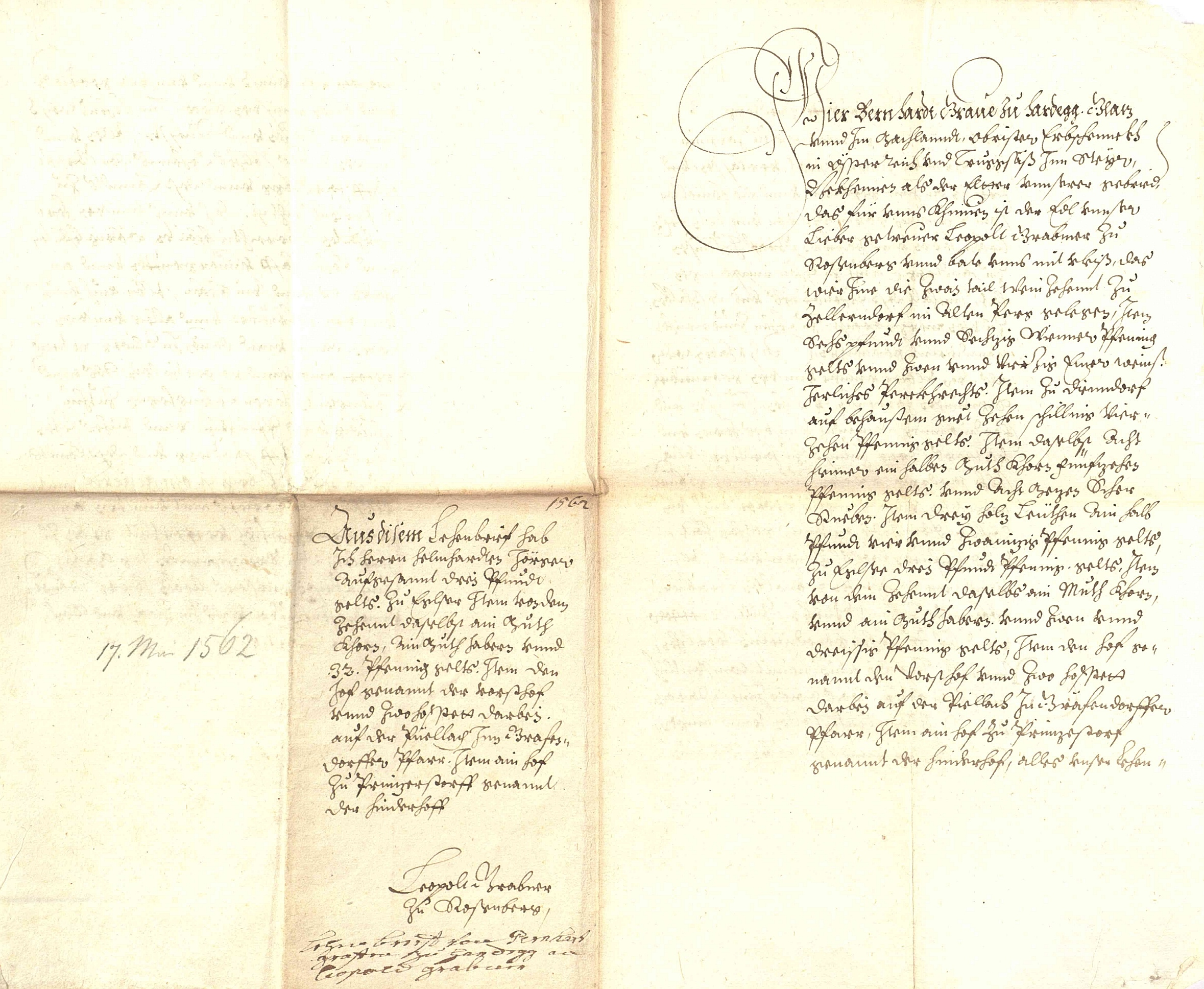
In 1562, imperial Count Bernhard Prüschenk von Hardegg enfeoffed Leopold Grabner zu Rosenberg with the Hardegg fiefs left behind by his brother Georg

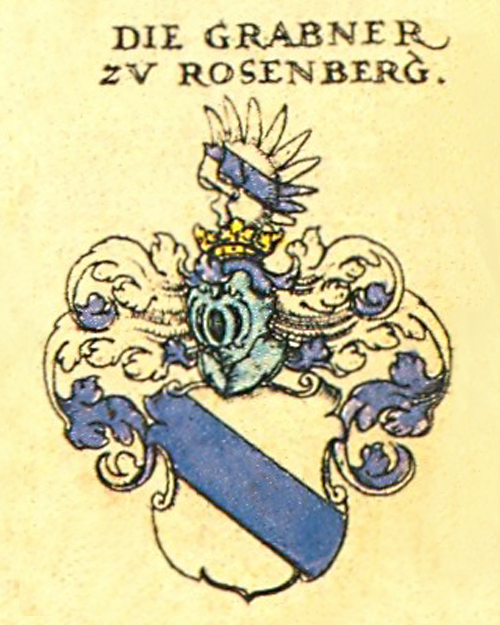
Family coat of arms

Leopold Grabner was the son of Sebastian I Grabner zu Rosenburg from the Grabner zu Rosenburg line of the Herren von Graben family and his first wife Apollonia von Pottenbrunn. During the 16th and early 17th centuries, the Grabners were among the richest and most respected families in Austria, and among the leading Protestant noble families in the country, and were therefore in opposition to the Habsburgs.

Georg Grabner married Anna von Neidegg, daughter of Hans von Neidegg zu Ranna and Barbara Firmian. Their son Wilhelm appears to have died early, and after her father's death, her daughter Elisabeth brought the Zagging estate into her marriage to Helmhard von Jörger zu Tollet, Baron zu Kreisbach, as an inheritance.

=== Political career and feudal lord ===
Georg Grabner took part in the defense of Vienna against the Ottomans in 1529 at a young age. In 1535 he inherited the Zagging Lordship and the Grafendorf fief from his father. He and his half-brother Josaphat Grabner zu Rosenburg shared the Pottenbrunn Lordship in common. When Josaphat died as an imperial ensign in Hungary, he bequeathed half of the Aggsbach fief to Georg, which he received from his older half-brother Christoph Grabner zu Rosenburg zu Waasen; the other half belonged to his younger half-brother Leopold Grabner zu Rosenburg. Georg also received the fiefs of Siebenbrunn, Rohrenbrunn, Stinkenbrunn and Seebarn. Georg and Josaphat were joint lords of Pottenbrunn from 1535 to 1562 (between 1562 and 1564 it was Josaphat and Leopold and then Leopold alone).

Georg Grabner was a regimental councilor between 1537 and 1540 and then appointed to the Lower Austrian knighthood. He was an early and zealous supporter of Protestant doctrine. He donated a tithe of grain for his chaplain in Hain and gave him the office of Staasdorf near Tulln. He bought farmhouses in Wetzmansdorf and Weidling, which he gave to the hospitals and retirement homes in Herzogenburg and Viehofen. In 1559 Grabner set up a beneficium in the Kleinhain parish church for two clergymen who were fond of the Reformation.

On the part of the imperial Counts of Hardegg, Georg Grabner held the Hardegg fiefdoms, manors and tithes in Zellerndorf, Diendorf and Egelsee, the so-called Forsthof and 2 farms on the Pielach in the Grafendorf parish and a farm in Prutzendorf, called the Backyard. After his death in 1562, Count Bernhard Prüschenk von Hardegg entrusted his younger brother and heir Leopold with the goods he had left behind. Leopold also inherited the lordship of Rosenburg from Georg.
