= Family tree of the House of Orange (1450–1815) =

A summary family tree of the House of Orange-Nassau

From the joining of the house of Nassau-Breda/Dillenburg and the House of Chalon-Arlay-Orange to the end of the Dutch Republic is shown below. The family spawned many famous statesmen and generals, including two of the acknowledged "first captains of their age", Maurice of Nassau and the Marshal de Turenne.

John V Count of Nassau-Siegen; 1455–1516; Stadholder of Gelderland	John IV; Prince of Orange, 1475–1502
William the Rich; Count of Nassau-Siegen 1487- 1559	Henry III; Count of Nassau-Breda; 1483–1538	Claudia of Chalon; 1498–1521	Philibert of Chalon of Chalon; Prince of Orange; 1502–1530
William I "the Silent"; 1533–1584; Prince of Orange 1544; Stadholder of Holland, Zealand & Utrecht	Louis; 1538–1574	Adolf; 1540–1568	Henry; 1550–1574	John VI "the Elder"; 1536–1606; Stadholder of Gelderland	René of Chalon; 1519–1544; Prince of Orange r.1521
Philip William; 1554–1618; Prince of Orange r.1584	Maurice; 1567–1625; Prince of Orange r.1618 Stadholder of Holland, Zealand, Utrecht, etc.	Frederick Henry; 1584–1647; Prince of Orange r.1625 Stadtholder of Holland, Zeeland, & etc.	Louise Juliana; 1576–1644 married Frederick IV Elector Palatine from whom the British royal family descends	Elisabeth; 1577–1642 married Henri de La Tour d'Auvergne; Duke of Bouillon	(illeg.); Justinus van Nassau; 1559–1631; Admiral & General; Governor of Breda 1601–1625	William Louis "Us Heit"; Count of Nassau-Dillenburg; 1560–1620; Stadtholder of Friesland, Groningen, and Drenthe	Ernst Casimir; Count of Nassau-Dietz; 1573–1632; Stadtholder of Friesland, Groningen, and Drenthe	John VII "the Middle"; Count of Nassau-Siegen r.1561–1623
(illeg.); William of Nassau; 1601–1627; Lord of de Lek	(illeg.); Louis of Nassau; Lord of De Lek and Beverweerd; 1602–1665	Charles I King of England; 1630-1685	Elizabeth Stuart, Queen of Bohemia (1596–1662)	Frederick V Elector Palatine r.1610 King of Bohemia r.1619–1621	Henri de la Tour d'Auvergne; Vicomte de Turenne & Marshal-General of France; 1611–1675
James II; King of England	Mary; Princess Royal	William II; 1626–1650; Prince of Orange & Stadholder of Holland, Zealand, etc, r.1647	Louise Henriette; 1627–1667 married Frederick William, the Great Elector	(illeg.); Frederick Nassau de Zuylestein; 1608–1672 general of the army	Albertine Agnes; 1634–1696)	William Frederick; 1613–1664; Count —later Prince— of Nassau-Dietz, Stadtholder of Friesland, Groningen and Drenthe	Henry Casimir I Count of Nassau-Dietz; 1612–1640; Stadtholder of Friesland, Groningen and Drenthe	John Maurice "the Brazilian"; Prince of Nassau-Siegen; 1604–1679; Governor of Dutch Brazil; Field Marshal of the Dutch Army
Mary II; Queen of England	William III; 1650–1702; Prince of Orange 1650; Stadholder of Holland, Zealand, etc, 1672; King of England, 1689	ceded claims to the lands of Orange to France in 1713 but kept right to use the title in its German form. Kings of Prussia and later German Emperors currently Georg Friedrich, Prince of Prussia, "Prinz von Oranien"	Earls of Rochford in England	Henry Casimir II; Prince of Nassau-Dietz; 1657–1696; Stadtholder of Friesland, Groningen and Drenthe
John William Friso; 1687–1711 appointed heir by William III; Prince of Orange r.1702 Stadholder of Frieslandr.1696
Anne; Princess Royal of England	William IV; 1711–1751; Prince of Orange; Stadholder of Holland, Zealand, etc. 1747
Wilhelmina of Prussia	William V 1748–1806; Prince of Orange r.1751 Stadholder of Holland, Zealand, etc. r.1751–1795	Carolina; 1743–1787	Charles Christian; Prince of Nassau-Weilburg r.1735–1788
Princess Louise of Orange-Nassau; 1770–1819 married Karl, Hereditary Prince of Braunschweig(-Wolfenbuttel)	Prince Frederick of Orange-Nassau; 1774–1799	William VI; 1772–1843; Fürst of Nassau-Orange-Fulda; 1803–1806; Fürst of Nassau-Orange; Prince of Orange r.1806 later William I King of the Netherlands r.1815	Frederick William; Prince of Nassau-Weilburg; 1768–1816
Royal Family of the Netherlands	William; Duke of Nassau; 1792–1839
Adolphe; 1817–1905; Duke of Nassau r.1839–1866 Grand Duke of Luxembourg r.1890–1905
House of Luxembourg-Nassau

William I, 1772–1843, King of the Netherlands, 1815–1840	Wilhelmina of Prussia
William II, 1792–1849, King of the Netherlands, 1840	Anna Pavlovna of Russia	Prince Frederick of the Netherlands, 1797–1881	Princess Pauline of Orange-Nassau, 1800–1806	Princess Marianne of the Netherlands, 1810–1883 married Prince Albert of Prussia (1809–1872)
Emma of Waldeck-Pyrmont	William III, 1817–1890, King of the Netherlands, 1849	Sophia of Württemberg	Prince Alexander of the Netherlands, 1818–1848	Prince Henry of the Netherlands, "the Navigator" 1820–1879	Princess Sophie of the Netherlands, 1824–1897 married Charles Alexander, Grand Duke of Saxe-Weimar-Eisenach	Princess Louise of the Netherlands,1828–1871 married Charles XV of Sweden	Princess Marie of the Netherlands, 1841–1910 married William, Prince of Wied one son was William, Prince of Albania
Wilhelmina, 1880–1962, Queen of the Netherlands, 1890–1948 To 1907 after 1907	Henry of Mecklenburg-Schwerin 1876–1934, Prince of the Netherlands	William, Prince of Orange 1840–1879	Prince Maurice of the Netherlands, 1843–1850	Alexander, Prince of Orange, 1851–1884
Juliana 1909–2004, Queen of the Netherlands, 1948–1980	Prince Bernhard of Lippe-Biesterfeld, Prince of the Netherlands 1911–2004
Beatrix,1938–, Queen of the Netherlands,1980–2013	Claus van Amsberg,1926–2002, Prince of the Netherlands	Princess Irene of the Netherlands, 1939, m.(1964–1981) Carlos Hugo of Bourbon-Parma, Duke of Parma, 4 children not eligible for throne	Princess Margriet of the Netherlands, 1943–	Pieter van Vollenhoven	Princess Christina of the Netherlands,(1947–2019), m. Jorge Pérez y Guillermo (m. 1975; div. 1996), 3 children not eligible for throne
William-Alexander of the Netherlands,1967– Prince of Orange & Heir Apparent, 1980–2013, King of the Netherlands, 2013–	Queen Maxima of the Netherlands	Prince Friso of Orange-Nassau 1968–2013 m.(2004) Mabel Wisse Smit without permission, his children are not eligible for the throne and he was no longer a Prince of the Netherlands after his marriage	Prince Constantijn of the Netherlands, 1969–	Princess Laurentien of the Netherlands	4 sons, 2 of whom were eligible for the throne until Beatrix abdicated in 2013
Princess Catharina-Amalia of the Netherlands,2003– Princess of Orange & heiress apparent, 2013–	Princess Alexia of the Netherlands, 2005–	Princess Ariane of the Netherlands, 2007–	Countess Eloise of Orange-Nassau, 2002–	Count Claus-Casimir of Orange-Nassau, 2004–	Countess Leonore of Orange-Nassau, 2006–

== See also ==
- Dutch monarchs family tree
