= Ernst Karl von Hoyos-Sprinzenstein =

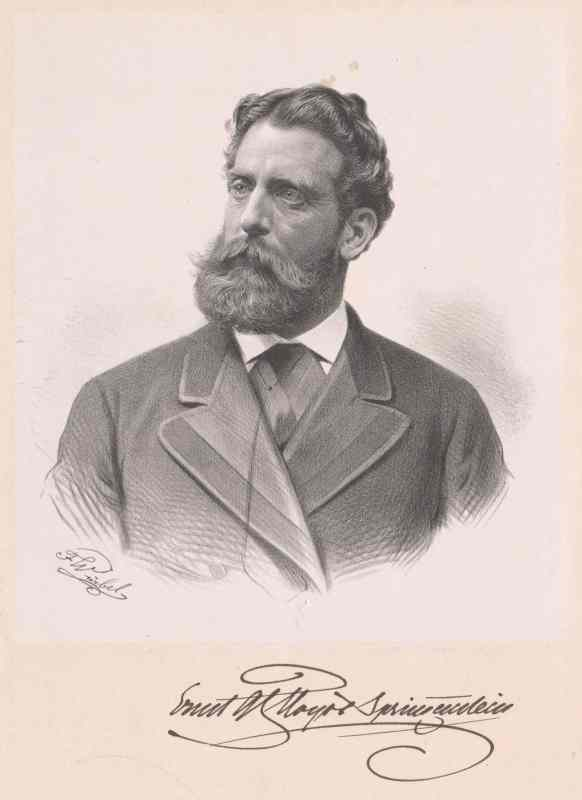
Ernst Karl von Hoyos-Sprinzenstein; lithograph by Franz Würbel (1822-1900)

Ernst Karl Heinrich, Count Hoyos-Sprinzenstein (18 June 1830 – 21 August 1903, Ternitz) was an Austrian nobleman, landowner, and politician.

== Early life ==
Hoyos was born in Vienna on 18 June 1830. He was the son of Count Henrich von Hoyos-Sprinzenstein (1804–1854), and Countess Felicia Zichy von Zich und Vásonkeö (1809–1880). Among his siblings were Ladislaus Maria von Hoyos-Sprinzenstein (who married Countess Franziska Seraphica von Herberstein); Marie von Hoyos-Sprinzenstein (who married Count Dénes Széchenyi, brother of Count Imre Széchényi); Joseph Theodor von Hoyos-Sprinzenstein (who married Marie Franziska Nemetschke, widow of Friedrich von Amerling); Maximilian von Hoyos-Sprinzenstein (who married Baroness Therese von Wenckheim); Stanislaus von Hoyos-Sprinzenstein (who married Baroness Aloisia Sedlnitzky-Odrowaz von Choltitz) and Giulia von Hoyos-Sprinzenstein (who married Filippo I Orsini, Duke of Gravina).

The Hoyos family was originally from Spain and emigrated to Austria in the 16th century, to serve the Emperor Ferdinand I, who was also of Spanish origin. His paternal grandparents were Countess Maria Therese von Schlabrendorff and Johann Ernst Hoyos-Sprinzenstein, was an Imperial Count. His maternal grandparents were Count Károly Antal Zichy (a son of Count Károly Zichy) and, his second wife, Countess Júlianna Festetics de Tolna.

== Career ==
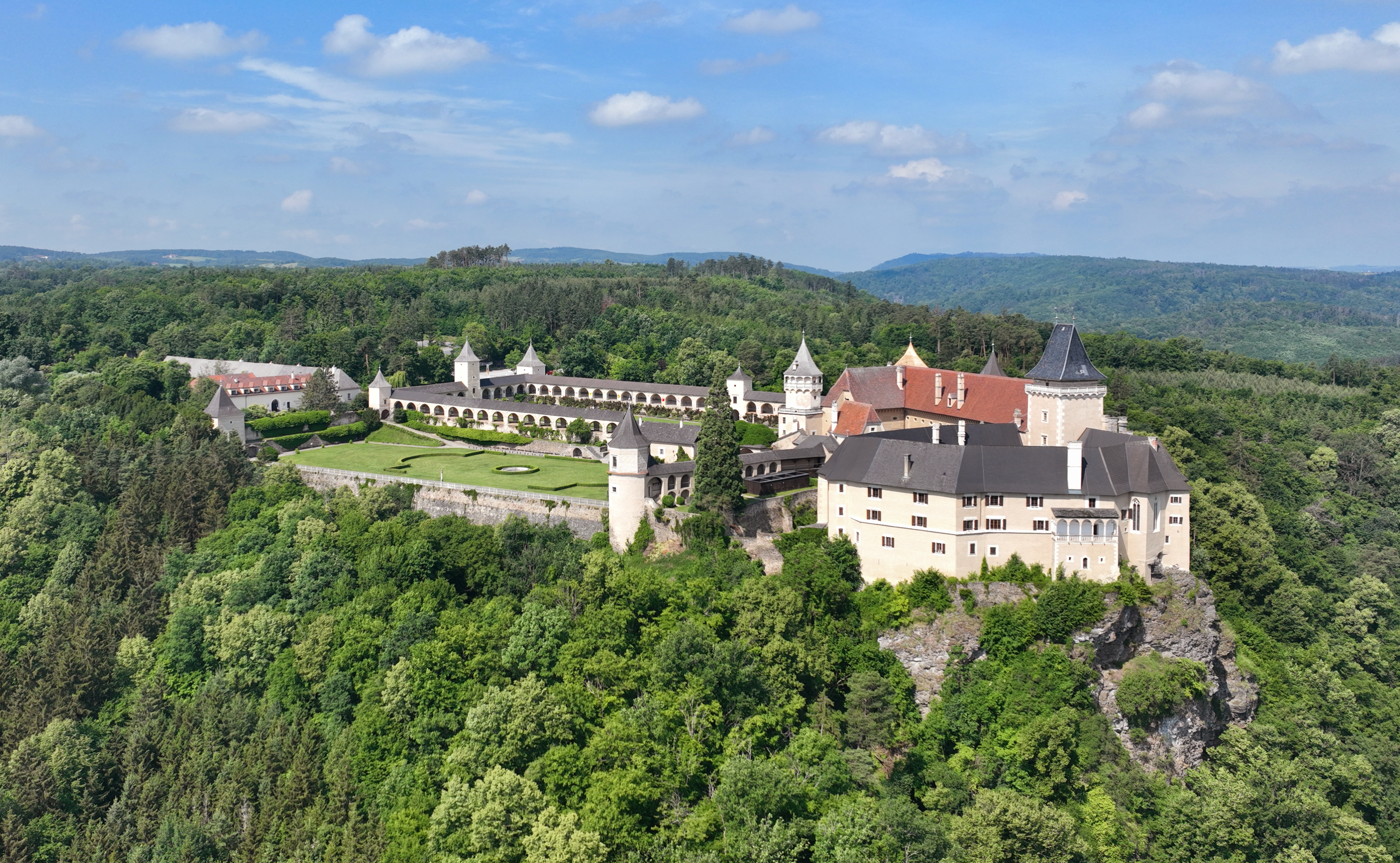
Rosenburg Castle

He was an Imperial-royal Chamberlain and, in 1861, was appointed by Emperor Franz Joseph I as a hereditary member of the Herrenhaus of the Austrian Reichsrats. He occasionally served as its Vice-President. From 1874 to 1883, he was a member of the building commission for the new Austrian Parliament Building; constructed on the Ringstraße.

In 1864, he agreed to donate the "Stixensteinquelle" (spring), near the Burg Stixenstein in Lower Austria, to the City of Vienna. This made it possible to build the First Vienna Mountain Spring Pipeline, the city's first major source of safe drinking water. The spring had been passed down in his family since 1555.

His most notable achievement was the reconstruction of the partially ruined Rosenburg Castle. The restorative work, which was partially based on representations from the Topographia Windhagiana (1673), was begun in 1859 and lasted for over two decades. It was made partially accessible to the public before the end of the 19th century, and is still a major tourist attraction.

He was a Knight in the Order of the Golden Fleece and, after donating his spring, was named an Honorary Citizen of Vienna.

== Personal life ==
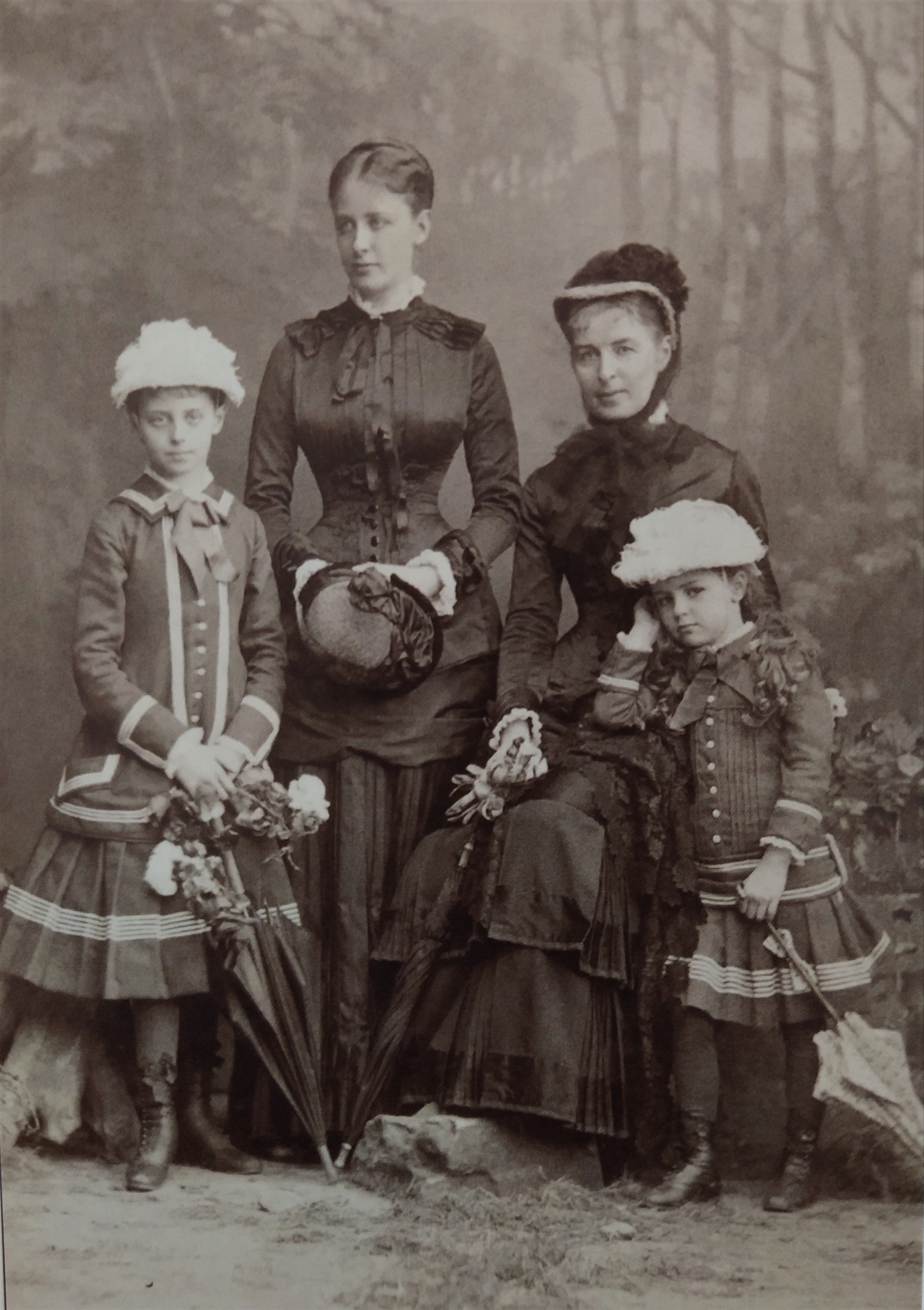
Photograph of his wife, Eleonore, and daughters, Ida, Marie, and Sofia, from the late 1870s

In 1856, he was married to Countess Eleonore von Paar (1835–1913), a daughter of Karl, 4th Prince Paar von Hartberg und Krottenstein, and Princess Ida of Liechtenstein (a daughter of Johann I Joseph, Prince of Liechtenstein). Together, they were the parents of:

- Count Ernst Karl von Hoyos-Sprinzenstein (1856–1940), who married Countess Maria Leontine Larisch von Moennich, a daughter of Count Leo Larisch von Mönnich and Princess Elena Știrbey.
- Countess Maria von Hoyos-Sprinzenstein (1858–1938), who married Franz von Clam und Gallas, only son of Gen. Count Eduard von Clam und Gallas and his wife, Countess Clothilde von Dietrichstein (youngest daughter of co-heiress of Prince Joseph-Franz von Dietrichstein).
- Count Alfred von Hoyos-Sprinzenstein (1862–1899), who married Countess Kunigunde Rosine von Westphalen zu Fürstenberg, a daughter of Count Friedrich von Westphalen.
- Count Heinrich von Hoyos-Sprinzenstein (1865–1955), who married Countess Caroline von Trauttmansdorff-Weinsberg, a daughter of Count Ferdinand von Trauttmansdorff-Weinsberg.
- Count Karl von Hoyos-Sprinzenstein (1867–1947)
- Countess Ida von Hoyos-Sprinzenstein (1870–1946), who married Prince Karl Friedrich of Schwarzenberg, son of Prince Karl III of Schwarzenberg and Princess Wilhelmine of Oettingen-Oettingen.
- Countess Sophia von Hoyos-Sprinzenstein (1874–1922), who married Count Adolf Arnost von Waldstein-Wartenberg, a son of Count Ernest Anton Franz de Paula von Waldstein-Wartenberg.

Hoyos died at Ternitz on 21 August 1903.
