= Rosenburg =

Austrian castle

- Rosenburg-Mold, Austria
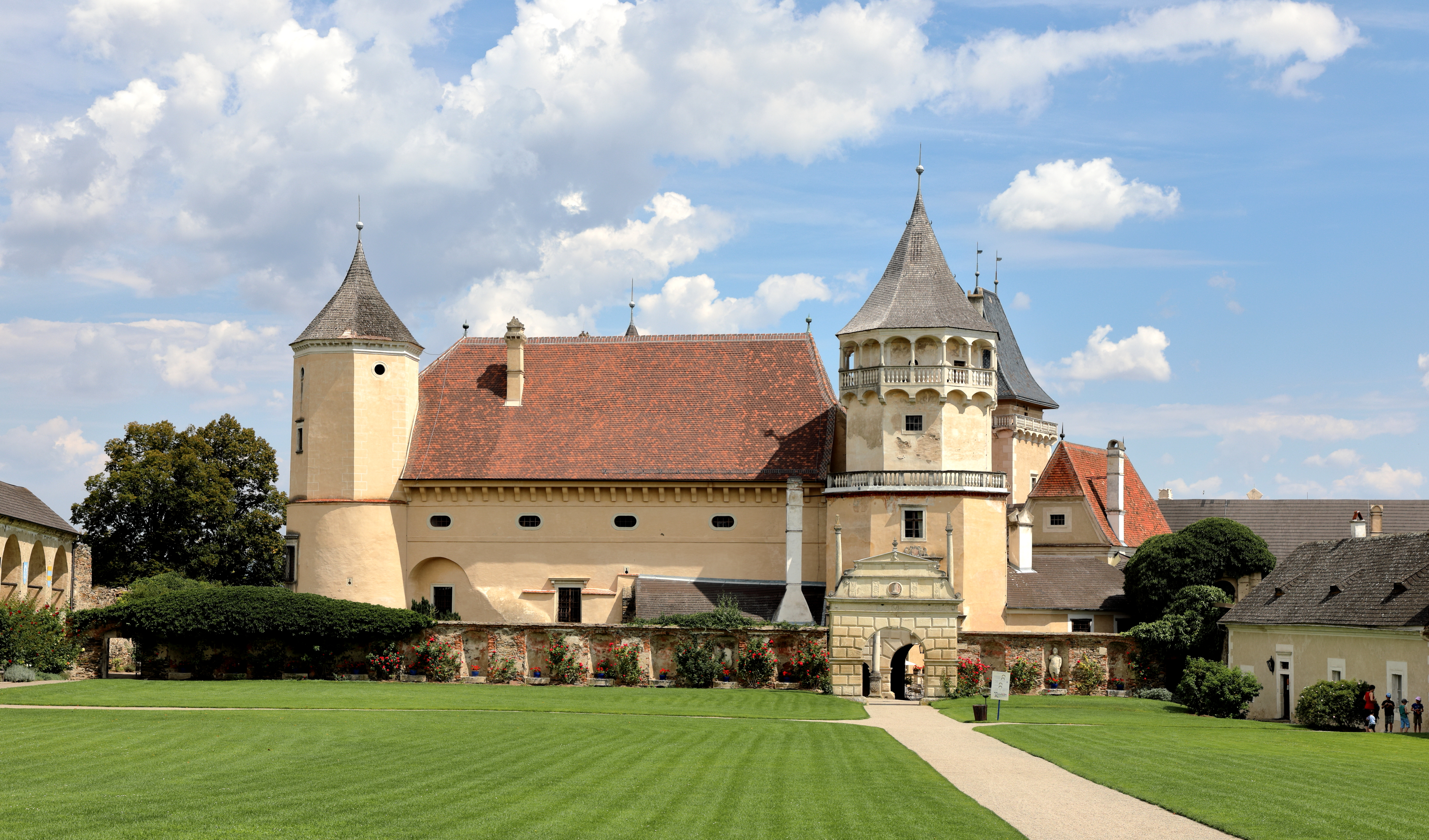

Site information
- Type: Renaissance castle
- Owner: Hoyos-Sprinzenstein family
- Open to the public: Yes
- Condition: Restored

Location
- Coordinates: 48°37′38″N 15°38′3″E

Site history
- Built: 1175

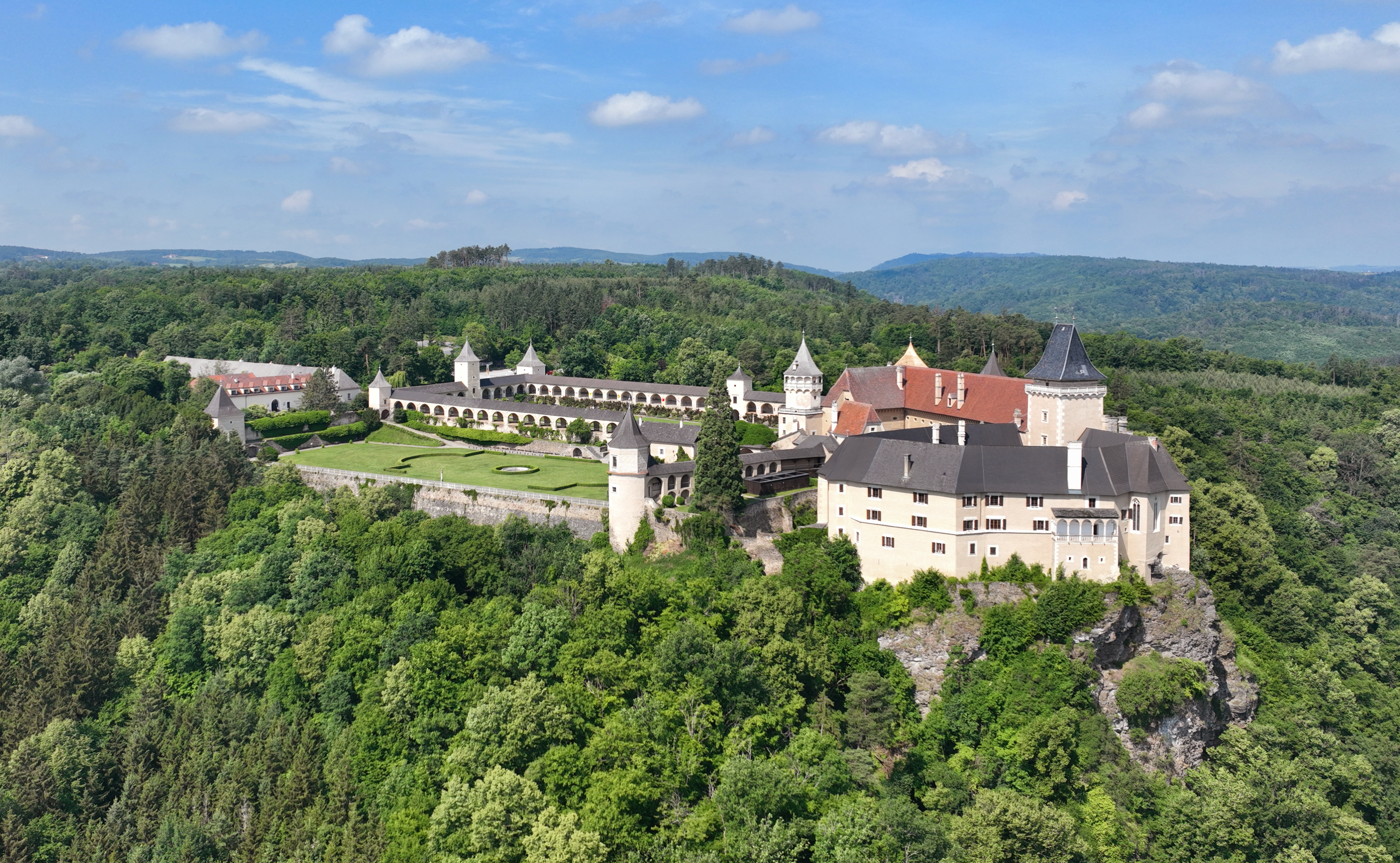
Aerial view of Rosenburg Castle in Lower Austria

Rosenburg is a castle in the municipality Rosenburg-Mold, Lower Austria, Austria. Rosenburg is on a cliff above the valley of the River Kamp at an elevation of 345 metres (1,132 ft) above sea level. It is one of Austria's most visited Renaissance castles. It is situated in the middle of a nature reserve - the Naturpark Kamptal - which adds to its appeal. There are various castles and fortifications in Austria and Germany that bear the name "Rosenburg", but if people use the term without further specifications, it may be understood that they refer to this site in Lower Austria. The well-known Austrian folk song "Es liegt ein Schloss in Österreich" ("There is a castle in Austria") is often assumed to refer to the Rosenburg.

== History ==
=== Origin and Middle Ages ===
The first written record of Rosenburg dates back to 1175. The first castle on the site was erected in Romanesque style in the 12th century. Of this castle, only some of the foundations are preserved in the base of the current castle keep. Catholic Rosenburg was razed by Hussite forces in 1433. In 1476 the Rosenburg was vastly extended under the rule of Count Kaspar von Rogendorf, chamberlain of Emperor Frederick III. With this extension, the castle was transformed into the then-popular Gothic style. The current chapel and most of the outer-most walls are the best preserved examples of construction in this period. After this expansion, the Rosenburg served repeatedly as a stronghold of the Austrian armies in their struggle with Hungarian invaders. In 1487, the castle was sold to Jakob and Christoph Grabner from the Lord's Von Graben.

=== Renaissance and early modern era ===
Their descendants adopted the Protestant faith in the course of the 16th century and made Rosenburg a center of Austrian Reformation history. Leopold Grabner zu Rosenburg and his son Sebastian II Grabner zu Rosenburg should be mentioned here. Under the two Grabners, who belonged to the Protestant and Lutheran classes, the Rosenburg became a center of Protestantism in Lower Austria. Protestant literature was printed in a printing press specially set up at the castle by Leopold Grabner. From 1593 to 1597, under the rule and by order of Sebastian II Grabner, most of the Gothic Rosenburg was demolished and the castle was reconstructed in Renaissance style with 13 towers. Troubles beset the area in 1611 when the Counter Reformation caused yet another change in landlords. That was when the Roman Catholic Cardinal Franz von Dietrichstein (1570 – 1636) gained control of the Rosenburg. In 1614 Rosenburg he further expanded to include tournament grounds and 46 arcades.

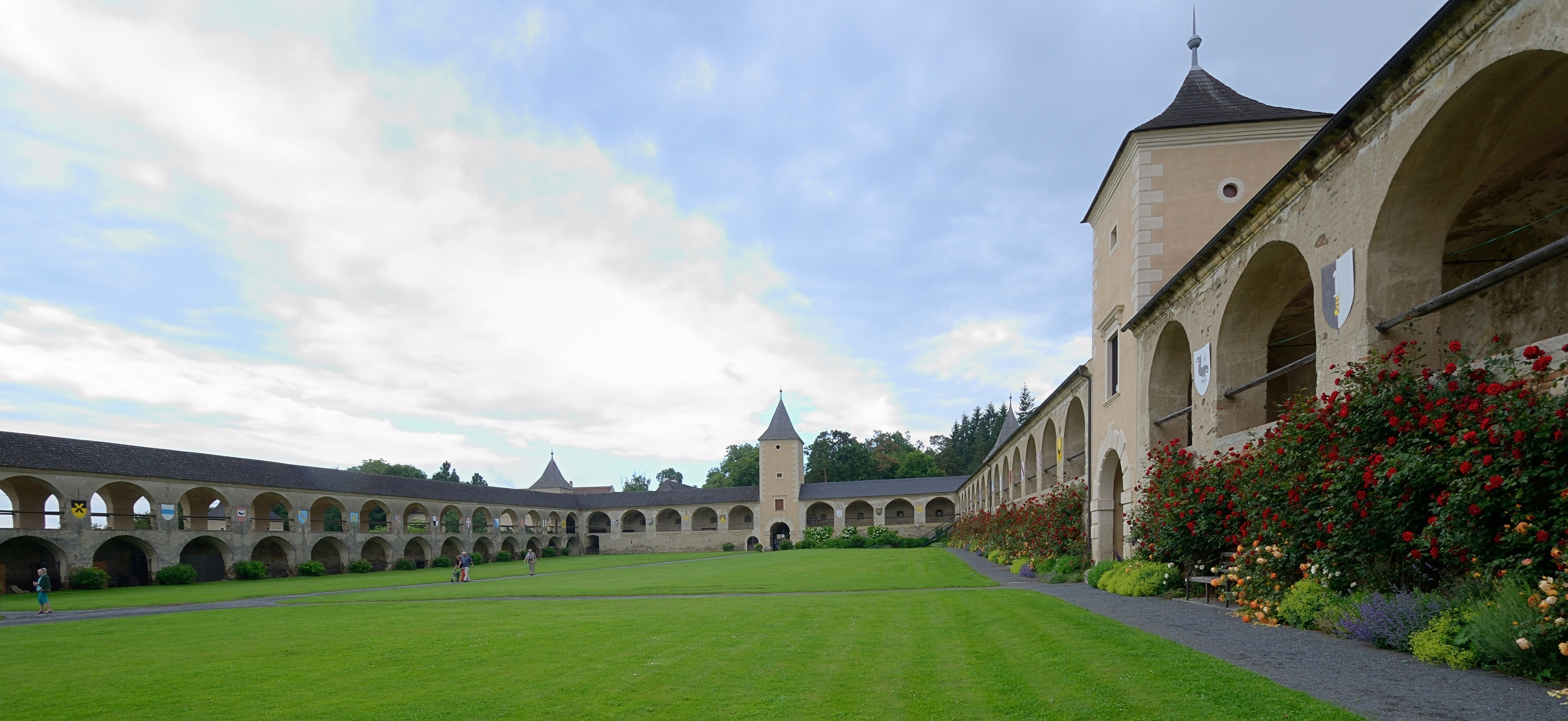
Tournament ground and arcades

The cardinal's tenure did not please the local Protestants, for in 1620, the castle was besieged and finally conquered by Lutheran troops of the "Horner Bund" ("Horn Union", referring to the nearby town of Horn).

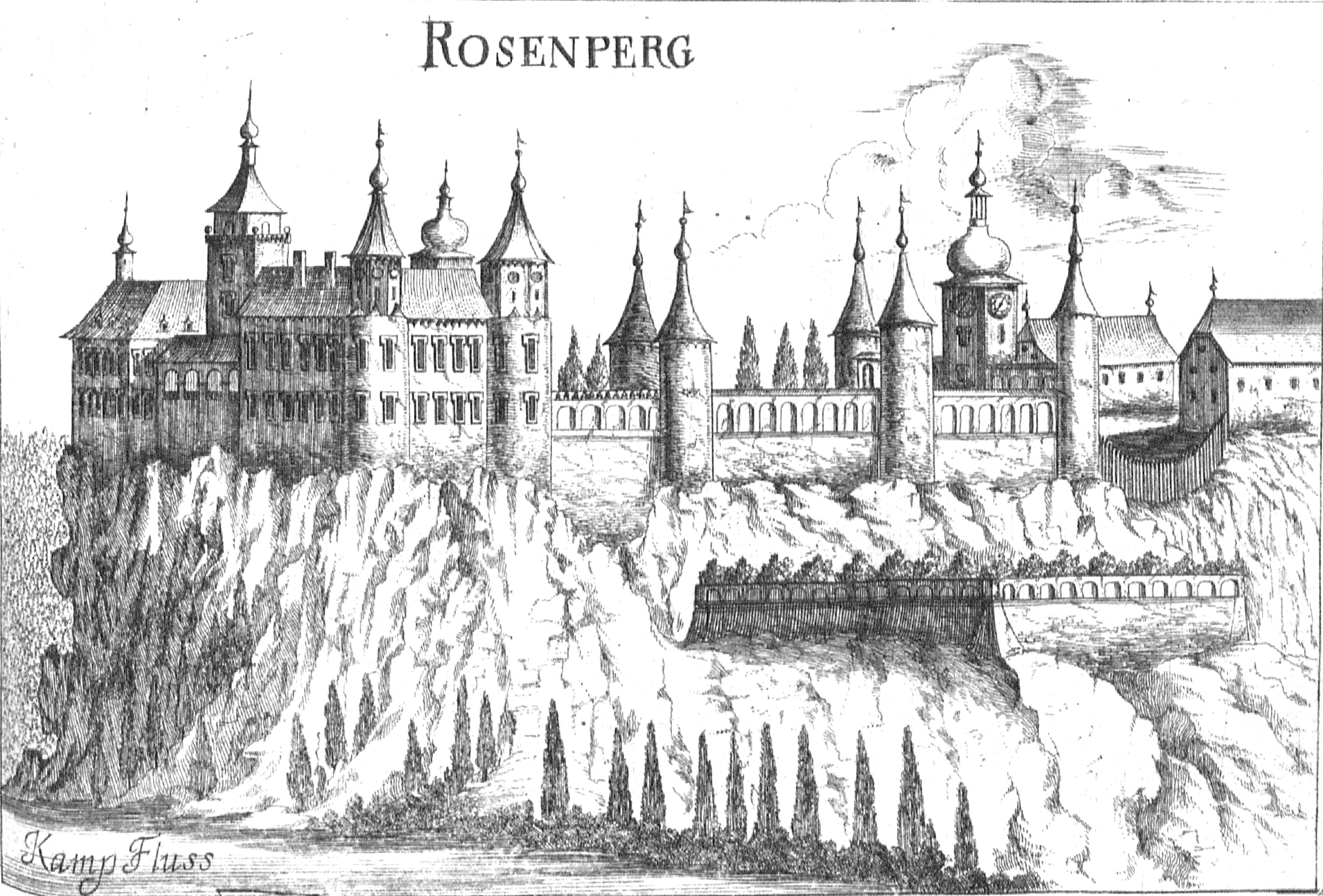
Rosenburg sketch, 1672

Finally, the Rosenburg became the property of the House of Sprinzenstein. When Countess Maria Regina von Sprinzenstein married Count Leopold Graf Hoyos in 1681, the two dynasties merged and the new landlords of the Rosenburg were now called "von Hoyos-Sprinzenstein". A period of neglect followed, then several tragedies struck. Lightning caused a fire in 1721, and another fire broke out in 1751 which destroyed part of the courtyard gate and the chapel. In 1800, another fire damaged the Rosenburg; it was barely used for some 60 years thereafter. Fortunately, the Romantic Era caused a renewed interest in castles, and the castle was renovated by Count Ernst Karl von Hoyos-Sprinzenstein, who rebuilt the castle at great personal expense between 1859 and 1889. The castle is now a museum.

=== 21st century ===
The von Hoyos-Sprinzenstein family survives today as owners of the Rosenburg. A tavern feeds the hungry crowds and people in fancy historic costumes do performances in falconry with all sorts of birds of prey. There are theatre performances in the central courtyard, including an annual Shakespeare Festival. The tournament grounds came to new life in the 20th century. On a site that was little used for medieval tournaments in that period, mock ones in historic costumes are now regularly held to entertain Rosenburg visitors. The popularity of the Rosenburg was increased even more when a collector's coin was minted by the Austrian National Bank in 1999—depicting the castle, including falcons and knights. Visitors can see the restored interior by attending one of the guided tours. Tours include a rather peculiar collection of fossils and historic objects that was gathered in the 19th century by a nobleman. Attractions nearby include the Baroque monastery of Altenburg, the medieval town of Horn, and neighboring Gars am Kamp and Eggenburg. To the south, one can reach Krems an der Donau and the Wachau River Valley, one of the most scenic areas of Austria. North are Retz, Geras (with another monastery), Hardegg and Drosendorf.

== See also ==
- List of castles in Austria
