= Family tree of Sicilian monarchs =

The first Sicilian monarch was Roger I, Count of Sicily. The last monarch was King Ferdinand III; during his reign, the Kingdom of Naples merged with the Kingdom of Sicily. The subsequent monarchs were Kings of the Two Sicilies.

See also:

- List of monarchs of Sicily
- List of monarchs of Naples
  - Kings of Naples family tree

Roger I 1031–1101 r. 1071–1101	Hauteville dynasty
Simon; 1093–1105 r. 1101–1105	Roger II; 1095–1154 r. 1105–1154	House of Hohenstaufen
Roger; 1118–1148	William I 1131–1166 r. 1154–1166	Constance I 1154–1198 r. 1194–1198	Henry I 1165–1197 r. 1194–1197
Tancred I 1138–1194 r. 1189–1194	William II; 1155–1189 r. 1166–1189	Frederick II; 1194–1250 r. 1198–1250	House of Capet
Roger III; 1175–1193 r. 1193	William III; 1186–1198 r. 1194	Henry II; 1211–1242 r. 1212–1217	Conrad I 1228–1254 r. 1250–1254	Manfred; 1232–1266 r. 1258–1266
Charles I 1226–1285 r. 1266–1282	Conrad II (Conradin); 1252–1268 r. 1254–1258	House of Barcelona
Charles II (Mainland territories); 1254–1309	Peter I 1239–1285 r. 1282–1285	Constance; 1249–1302
Eleanor; 1289–1341	Frederick III; 1272–1337 r. 1296–1337	James (II of Aragon); 1267–1327 r. 1285–1295
House of Trastámara	Peter II; 1305–1342 r. 1337–1342	Alfonso; 1299–1336
Frederick IV; 1341–1377 r. 1355–1377	Louis I 1337–1355 r. 1342–1355	Eleanor; 1325–1375	Peter; 1319–1387
Martin II; 1356–1410 r. 1409–1410	Eleanor; 1358–1382
Maria I 1363–1401 r. 1377–1401	Martin I 1374–1409 r. 1395–1409	Ferdinand I 1380–1416 r. 1412–1416
John I 1398–1479 r. 1458–1479	Alfonso I 1396–1458 r. 1416–1458
House of Habsburg	Ferdinand II; 1452–1516 r. 1479–1516
Joanna I 1479–1555 r. 1516–1555
House of Savoy	Charles II; 1500–1558 r. 1516–1554	Ferdinand; 1503–1564
Philip I 1527–1598 r. 1554–1598	Charles; 1540–1590
Catherine Michelle; 1567–1597	Philip II; 1578–1621 r. 1598–1621	Ferdinand; 1578–1637
Victor Amadeus; 1587–1637	Philip III; 1605–1665 r. 1621–1665	Maria Anna; 1606–1646	Ferdinand; 1608–1657
Charles Emmanuel; 1634–1675	Maria Theresa; 1638–1683	Charles III; 1661–1700 r. 1665–1700	Leopold; 1640–1705
Victor Amadeus; 1666–1732 r. 1713–1720	Louis; 1661–1711	Charles IV; 1685–1740 r.1720–1735
Philip IV; 1683–1746 r. 1700–1713
Charles V 1716–1788 r. 1735–1759
Ferdinand III; 1751–1825 r. 1759–1816
