= Family tree of Neapolitan monarchs =

This is a family tree of the Kings of Naples.

Louis VIII of France; 1187–1226	House of Capet
Louis IX of France; 1214–1270	Charles I 1226/1227–1266–1285
Philip III of France; 1245–1285	Charles II; 1254–1285–1309	House of Barcelona
Charles, Count of Valois; 1270–1325	Margaret, Countess of Anjou; 1272–1299	Charles Martel of Anjou; 1271–1295	Saint Louis of Toulouse; 1274–1297	Robert; 1276–1309–1343	Philip I, Prince of Taranto; 1278–1332	Raymond Berengar of Andria; 1282–1307	Peter Tempesta; 1291–1315	John, Duke of Durazzo; 1294–1336	Eleanor of Anjou; 1289–1341	Frederick III of Sicily; 1272–1337
Philip VI of France; 1293–1350	Charles I of Hungary; 1288–1342	Charles, Duke of Calabria; 1298–1328	Peter II of Sicily; 1305–1342
John II of France; 1319–1364	Louis I of Hungary; 1326–1382	Andrew, Duke of Calabria; 1327–1345	Joan I 1328–1343–1382	Louis I 1320–1352–1362	Maria of Calabria; 1329–1366	Charles, Duke of Durazzo; 1323–1348	Louis of Durazzo, Count of Gravina; 1324–1362	Peter IV of Aragon; 1319–1387	Eleanor of Sicily; 1325–1375
Charles V of France; 1338–1380	Louis I, Duke of Anjou titular king 1339–1382–1384	Charles Martel, Duke of Calabria; 1345–1348	Margaret of Durazzo; 1347–1412	Charles III (II of Hungary); 1345–1382–1386	John I of Castile; 1358–1390	Eleanor of Aragon; 1358–1382
Charles VI of France; 1368–1422	Louis II; 1377–1417 r. 1389–1399 titular king 1384–1389, 1399–1417	Louis I, Duke of Orléans; 1372–1407	William, Duke of Austria; 1370–1406	Joan II; 1373–1414–1435	James II, Count of La Marche; 1370–1438	Ladislaus; 1377–1414 r. 1386–1389, 1399–1414	Ferdinand I of Aragon; 1380–1416
Charles VII of France; 1403–1461	Marie of Anjou; 1404–1463	René; 1409–1480 r. 1435–1442	Louis III; 1403–1434 titular king 1417–1426	Charles, Duke of Orléans; 1394–1465	Alfonso I 1396–1442–1458	John II of Aragon; 1398–1479	House of Trastámara
Louis XI of France; 1423–1483	Yolande, Duchess of Lorraine; 1428–1483	John II, Duke of Lorraine; 1424–1470 claimant	Ferdinand I 1423–1458–1494	Ferdinand III; 1452–1504–1516
Charles VIII of France; 1470–1498 r. 1495	René II, Duke of Lorraine; 1451–1508	Nicholas I, Duke of Lorraine; 1448–1473 claimant	Louis III; 1462–1515 r. 1501–1504	Alfonso II; 1448–1495 r. 1494–1495	Frederick; 1452–1504 r. 1496–1501	Philip I of Castile; 1478–1506	Joan III; 1479–1516–1555
Claude, Duke of Guise; 1496–1550	Ferdinand II; 1467–1496 r. 1495 (contested with Charles VIII of France); 1495–1496	Charles IV; 1500–1558 r. 1516–1554	Ferdinand I, Holy Roman Emperor; 1503–1564
Francis, Duke of Guise; 1519–1563	Philip I 1527–1554–1598	Charles II, Archduke of Austria; 1540–1590
House of Lorraine	Henry I, Duke of Guise; 1550–1588	Philip II; 1578–1598–1621	Ferdinand II, Holy Roman Emperor; 1578–1637
Maria Anna of Spain; 1606–1646	Ferdinand III, Holy Roman Emperor; 1608–1657	House of Habsburg
Charles, Duke of Guise; 1571–1640	Elisabeth of France; 1602–1644	Philip III; 1605–1665 r. 1621–1647, 1648–1665	Mariana of Austria; 1634–1696
Henry II, Duke of Guise; 1614–1664 r. 1647–1648	Louis XIV of France; 1638–1715	Maria Theresa of Spain; 1638–1683	Charles V 1661–1665–1700	Margaret Theresa of Spain; 1651–1673	Leopold I, Holy Roman Emperor; 1640–1705	Eleonor Magdalene of Neuburg; 1655–1720	House of Wittelsbach
Louis, Grand Dauphin; 1661–1711
Philip IV; 1683–1746 r. 1700–1713	Charles VI; 1685–1740 r. 1714–1735
Charles VII; 1716–1788 r. 1735–1759	Francis I, Holy Roman Emperor; 1708–1765	Maria Theresa; 1717–1780
Maria Luisa of Spain; 1747–1792	Leopold II, Holy Roman Emperor; 1747–1792
Charles IV of Spain; 1748–1819	Ferdinand IV; 1751–1825 r. 1759–1799, 1799–1806, 1815–1825	Maria Carolina of Austria; 1752–1814
María Isabella of Spain; 1789–1848	Francis I 1777–1825–1830	Maria Theresa of Naples and Sicily; 1772–1807	Francis II, Holy Roman Emperor; 1768–1835	Ferdinand III, Grand Duke of Tuscany; 1769–1824	Princess Luisa of Naples and Sicily; 1773–1802
Maria Cristina of Savoy; 1812–1836	Ferdinand V 1810–1830–1859	Marie Louise, Duchess of Parma; 1791–1847	Napoleon; 1769–1821	Joseph Bonaparte; 1768–1844 r. 1806–1808	Joachim Murat; 1767–1808–1815	Caroline Bonaparte; 1782–1839	Maria Theresa of Austria; 1801–1855	Charles Albert of Sardinia; 1798–1849
Francis II; 1836–1894 r. 1859–1861	House of Bonaparte	House of Murat	Victor Emmanuel I 1820–1861–1878
House of Savoy	Umberto I 1844–1878–1900
Victor Emmanuel II; 1869–1947 r. 1900–1946
Umberto II; 1904–1983 r. 1946
