= Frederick William of Brandenburg =

Frederick William of Brandenburg may refer to:

- Frederick William, the Great Elector (1620–1688)
- Frederick William I of Prussia (1688–1740), also Elector of Brandenburg
- Frederick William II of Prussia (1744–1797), also Elector of Brandenburg
- Frederick William III of Prussia (1770–1840), also Elector of Brandenburg until 1806
