= Family tree of Greek monarchs =

Family tree of the House of Schleswig-Holstein-Sonderburg-Glücksburg

The following is a family tree for the Kings of the Hellenes of the House of Schleswig-Holstein-Sonderburg-Glücksburg, which ruled Greece between the election of Prince Wilhelm of Denmark (George I) to replace Otto of Greece in 1863 until the declaration of the Second Hellenic Republic in 1924, and again from 1935 until the abolition of the monarchy during the reign of King Constantine II in 1973. Those who ruled Greece are given in bold capitals.

Christian IX of Denmark; 1818–1906 r. 1863–1906	Constantine of Russia; 1827–1892	Michael of Russia; 1832–1909	Alexander II of Russia; 1818–1881 r. 1855–1881	Robert, Duke of Chartres; 1940–1910
Frederick VIII of Denmark; 1843–1912 r. 1906–1912	Alexandra; 1844–1925 m. Edward VII of the UK	**GEORGE I** 1845–1913 r. 1863–1913	**OLGA** Constantinovna; 1851–1926; Regent 1920	Vladimir of Russia; 1847–1909	Dagmar; 1847–1928	Alexander III of Russia; 1845–1894 r. 1881–1894	Frederick III of Germany; 1831–1888 r. 1888–1888	Thyra; 1853–1933 m. Ernest Augustus of Hanover	Valdemar; 1859–1939	Marie of Orléans; 1865–1909	Jean of Orléans; 1874–1920
Sophia of Prussia; 1870–1932	**CONSTANTINE I** 1868–1923 r. 1913–1917, 1920–1922	Alexandra; 1870–1891	Paul of Russia; 1860–1919	George of Russia; 1863–1919	Maria; 1876–1940	Andrew; 1882–1944 m. Alice of Battenberg	Wilhelm II of Germany; 1859–1941 r. 1888–1914	Aage; 1887–1940; Axel; 1888–1964; Erik; 1890–1950; Viggo; 1893–1970	Margaret; 1895–1992
Christian X of Denmark; 1870–1947 r. 1912–1947	George; 1869–1957 m. Marie Bonaparte	Maria Pavlovna; 1890–1958; Dimitri Pavlovich; 1891–1941	Nicholas; 1872–1938	Elena Vladimirovna; 1882–1937	Olga; 1881	Victoria Louise of Prussia; 1892–1980	Ernest Augustus III of Hanover; 1887–1953	Christopher; 1888–1940	Françoise of Orléans; 1902–1953
Peter; 1908–1980; Eugenie; 1910–1989	Olga; 1903–1997; Elizabeth; 1904–1955; Marina; 1906–1968	Nina; 1901–1974; Xenia; 1903–1965	Margarita; 1905–1981; Theodora; 1906–1969; Cecilie; 1911–1937	Philip; 1921–2021 m. Elizabeth II of the UK	Sophie; 1914–2001	George William of Hanover; 1915–2006	Michael; 1939–2024 m. Marina Karella
Frederik IX of Denmark; 1899–1972 r. 1947–1972	**GEORGE II**; 1890–1947 r. 1922–1924, 1935–1947	Elisabeth of Romania; 1894–1956	**ALEXANDER**; 1893–1920 r. 1917–1920 m. Aspasia Manos	Carol II of Romania; 1893–1953 r. 1930–1940	Helen; 1896–1982	**PAUL**; 1901–1964 r. 1947–1964	Frederica of Hanover; 1917–1981	Irene; 1904–1974 m. Aimone, Duke of Aosta	Katherine; 1913–2007 m. Richard Brandram
Margrethe II of Denmark born 1940 r. 1972–2024	Alexandra; 1921–1993 m. Peter II of Yugoslavia	Anne of Bourbon-Parma; 1923–2016	Michael I of Romania; 1921–2017	Sophia born 1938 m. Juan Carlos I of Spain	Anne-Marie of Denmark born 1946	**CONSTANTINE II**; 1940–2023 r. 1964–1973	Irene; 1942–2026	Amadeo, Duke of Aosta; 1943–2021	Paul Brandram; 1948–2020
Alexia born 1965 m. Carlos Morales Quintana	Pavlos born 1967 m. Marie-Chantal Miller	Nikolaos born 1969 m. Tatiana Ellinka Blatnik d. 2024 m. Chrysí Vardinogianni	Theodora born 1983 m. Matthew Jeremiah Khumar	Philippos born 1986 m. Nina Nastassja Flohr	Aimone, Duke of Aosta born 1967	Olga born 1973	Alexandra born 1968
