= Judenau-Baumgarten =

- Municipality
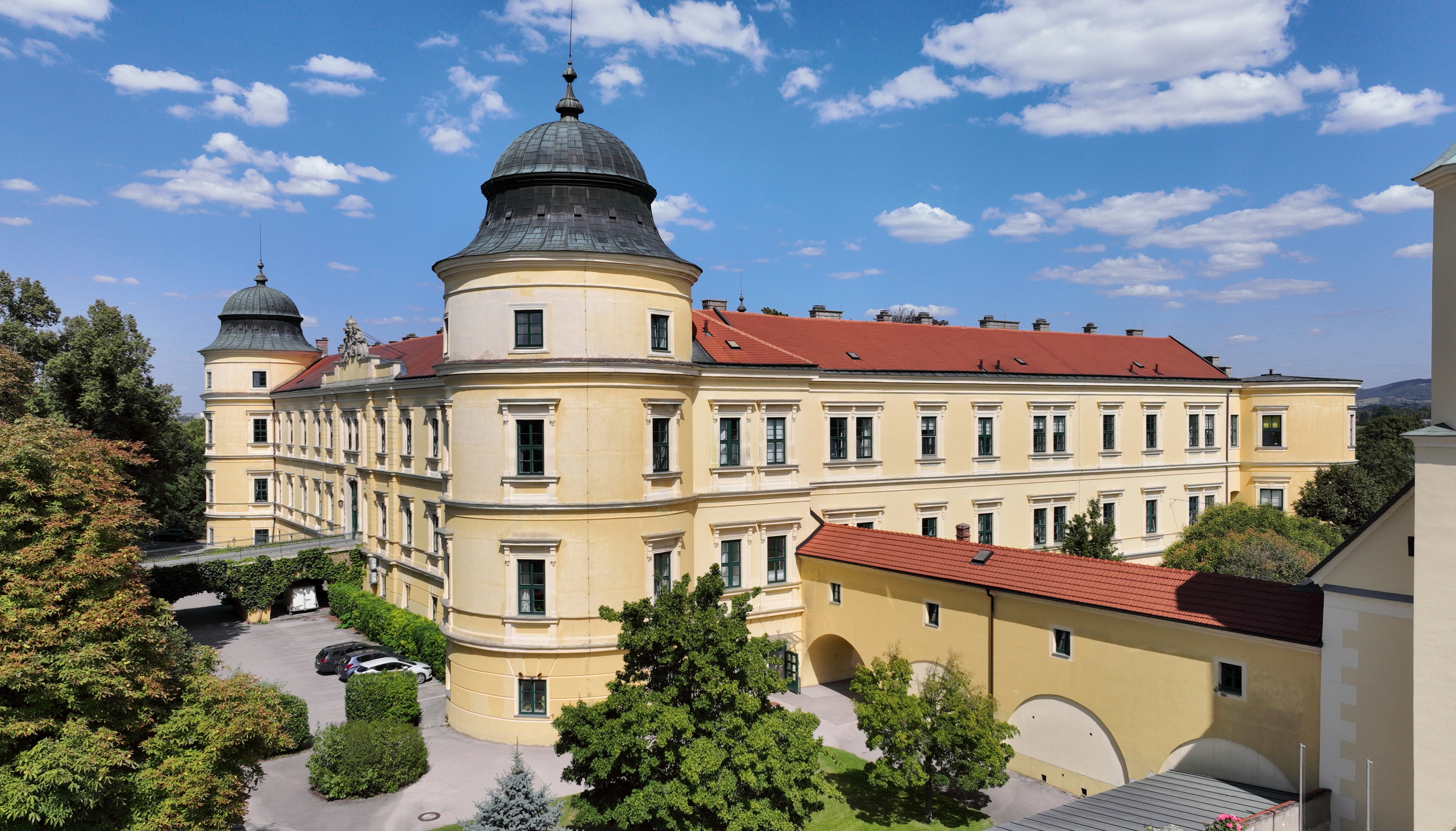
- Southwest view of Judenau Castle

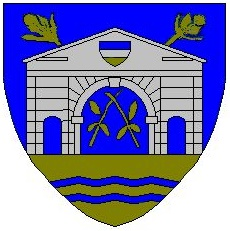
- Coat of arms

- Location within Austria
- Coordinates: 48°17′00″N 16°01′33″E
- Country: Austria
- State: Lower Austria
- District: Tulln

Government
  - Mayor: Friedrich Schaffler (ÖVP)

Area
  - Total: 14.35 km^{2} (5.54 sq mi)
- Elevation: 187 m (614 ft)

Population (2018-01-01)
  - Total: 2,262
  - Density: 157.6/km^{2} (408.3/sq mi)
- Time zone: UTC+1 (CET)
  - Summer (DST): UTC+2 (CEST)
- Postal code: 3441
- Area code: 02274
- Vehicle registration: TU
- Website: www.judenau-baumgarten.at

Judenau-Baumgarten is a market town in the district of Tulln in the Austrian state of Lower Austria.

== Public art ==
The town is the location of a 32-foot statue of American singer Michael Jackson, originally produced to promote the HIStory compilation album in 1995; it stands in the courtyard of a former nightclub.

== Population ==
Historical population
Year	Pop.	±%
1971	1,563	—
1981	1,617	+3.5%
1991	1,713	+5.9%
2001	2,075	+21.1%
