= Obersiebenbrunn =

- Municipality
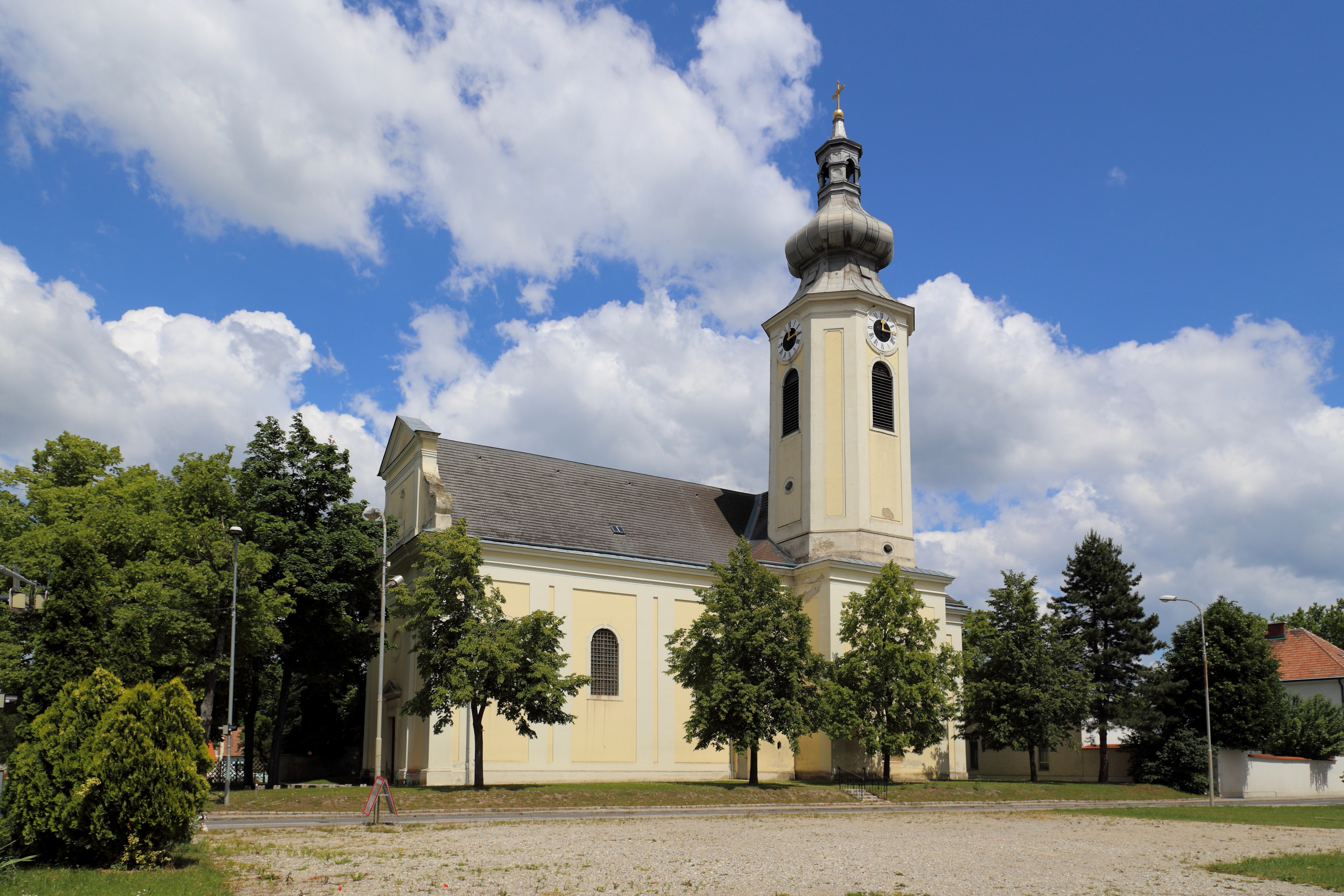
- Obersiebenbrunn parish church

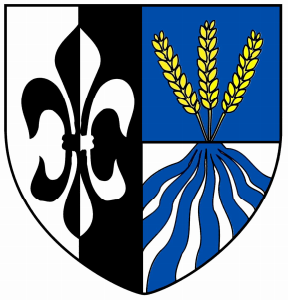
- Coat of arms

- Location within Austria
- Coordinates: 48°16′N 16°41′E
- Country: Austria
- State: Lower Austria
- District: Gänserndorf

Government
  - Mayor: Andreas Sinnhuber

Area
  - Total: 26.93 km^{2} (10.40 sq mi)
- Elevation: 151 m (495 ft)

Population (2018-01-01)
  - Total: 1,708
  - Density: 63.42/km^{2} (164.3/sq mi)
- Time zone: UTC+1 (CET)
  - Summer (DST): UTC+2 (CEST)
- Postal code: 2283
- Area code: 02286
- Website: www.obersiebenbrunn.at

Obersiebenbrunn is a town in the district of Gänserndorf in the Austrian state of Lower Austria.

== Population ==
Historical population
Year	Pop.	±%
1869	584	—
1880	705	+20.7%
1890	737	+4.5%
1900	809	+9.8%
1910	1,014	+25.3%
1923	1,271	+25.3%
1934	1,507	+18.6%
1939	1,562	+3.6%
1951	1,505	−3.6%
1961	1,391	−7.6%
1971	1,286	−7.5%
1981	1,149	−10.7%
1991	1,179	+2.6%
2001	1,416	+20.1%
2011	1,690	+19.4%
