= Gedersdorf =

- Municipality
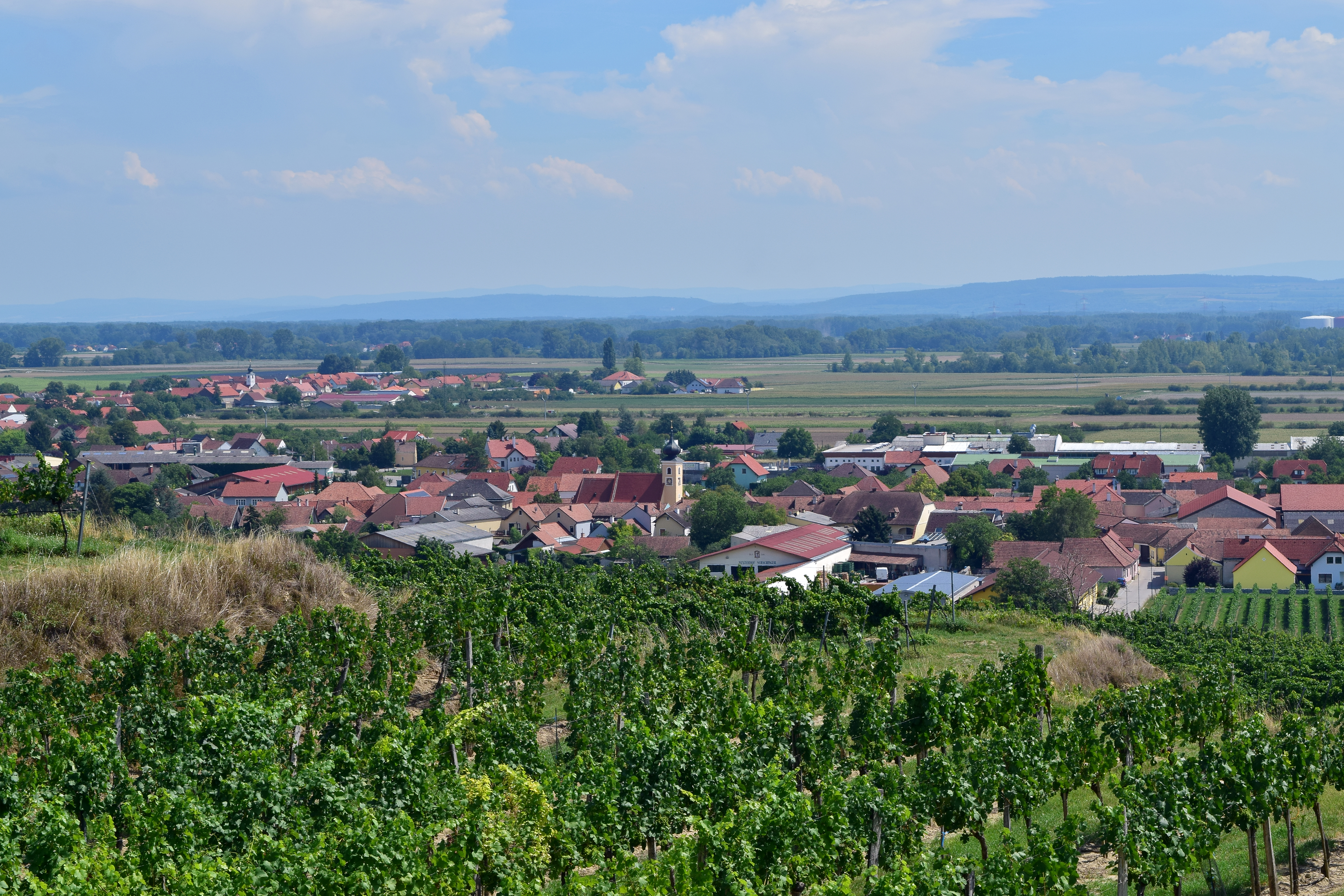

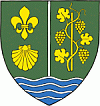
- Coat of arms

- Location within Austria
- Coordinates: 48°26′N 15°41′E
- Country: Austria
- State: Lower Austria
- District: Krems-Land

Government
  - Mayor: Franz Brandl (ÖVP)

Area
  - Total: 18.83 km^{2} (7.27 sq mi)
- Elevation: 194 m (636 ft)

Population (2018-01-01)
  - Total: 2,184
  - Density: 116.0/km^{2} (300.4/sq mi)
- Time zone: UTC+1 (CET)
  - Summer (DST): UTC+2 (CEST)
- Postal code: 3494
- Area code: 02735
- Website: www.gedersdorf.at

Gedersdorf is a municipality in the district of Krems-Land in the Austrian state of Lower Austria.

== Geography ==
The municipality consists of seven villages: Altweidling, Brunn im Felde, Donaudorf, Gedersdorf, Schlickendorf, Stratzdorf, and Theiß.

== History ==
It was formed in 1967 by the merger of three smaller municipalities.
