= Winifred O. Whelan =

Winifred "Win" O. Whelan School Sisters of St. Francis
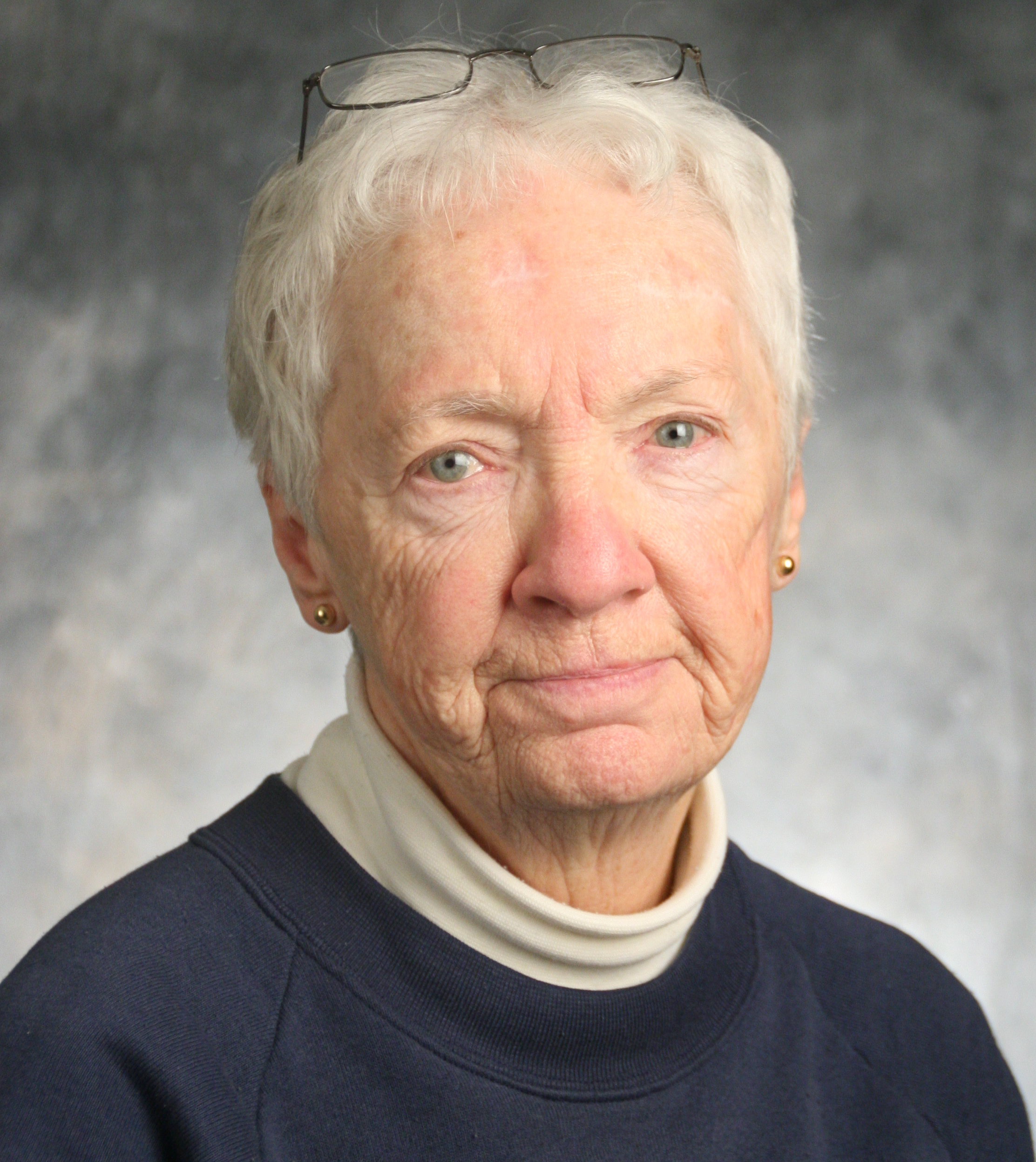

Personal life
- Born: March 5, 1931 (age 95) Chicago, Illinois
- Known for: Catholic education
- Occupation: Academic, teacher, writer

Religious life
- Religion: Catholic
- Institute: School Sisters of St. Francis

Winifred ("Win") O. Whelan (born March 5, 1931) is an American nun, member of the School Sisters of St. Francis (SSSF), academic, writer, and Wikipedian. She was born in the Jefferson Park neighborhood of Chicago, Illinois.

Whelan graduated from Alverno College with a bachelor's degree in 1950, majoring in Latin. She earned a master's degree in theology from Marquette University in 1969 and a Ph.D. in religious studies from Northwestern University in 1985. Her Ph.D. thesis was about the evolution of language in Catholic liturgy; it "received critical acclaim and helped elevate her reputation as a thought leader in her field".

Her career, which has focused on education and religious scholarship, began as a teacher in elementary schools in Wisconsin and Illinois, a role that "laid the foundation for her lifelong commitment to teaching". She taught high school Latin and theology in Wisconsin and Mississippi; after Vatican II, when more opportunities opened up for women religious, she worked in parishes in Illinois, including serving as the director of religious education in the Chicago area, "where she played a pivotal role in shaping religious instruction and community outreach".

After earning her Ph.D., Whelan became a professor at St. Bonaventure University. She served as head of the university's theology department and worked there until her retirement as a professor emerita in 1997. Her work there "was marked by a deep dedication to teaching and research". She wrote articles for academic journals about religious education and "how the Church could respond to its obligation to be an effective teacher". After her retirement, she taught English in Chile for six months. She studied linguistics "to deepen her understanding of language's role in religion", and was a member of the Catholic Theological Society of America and the College Theology Society. Whelan led a project to write and publish interviews with sisters from her order and has written several book reviews.

Whelan has written biographies of women in religion on Wikipedia as a member of its Women in Religion project, including those of Marie Pauline Brenner, a fellow member of the SSSF also based in Chicago, and Mary Corona Wirfs, who was Mother Superior of the SSSF from the 1940s to the 1960s. She has been called "a persistent advocate for women's presence in religious history...[who] addresses gender bias on the platform by increasing the representation of women in religion, driven by her belief that the individuals about whom she writes should be appreciated for their many meaningful contributions". As of 2026, Whelan was writing a chapter in a book on indigenous religions about Calixta Gabriel Xiquin, a Guatemalan Mayan spiritual guide.

Whelan enjoys photography as a hobby and has won several awards over the years. In June 2025, she celebrated 75 years as a consecrated sister. She currently lives in Chicago.

== Selected publications ==
Whelan speaking during WikiConference North America, 2026

- Whelan, Winifred. "The DRE as Middle Manager" (March 1987). The Living Light: An Interdisciplinary Review of Catholic Religious Education, Catechesis, and Ministry. 23 (3): 214–222.
- _____. "Evaluation as a Community Builder" (Summer 1990). The Living Light: An Interdisciplinary Review of Catholic Religious Education, Catechesis, and Ministry. 26 (4): 333–362.
- _____. "Bodily Knowing: "'More Ancient Than Thought'" (Spring 1994). Religious Education: The Journal of the Religious Education Association and the Association of Professors and Researchers in Religious Education. 89 (2): 184-193. https://doi.org/10.1080/0034408940890204
- _____. "Postmodernism in the Work of Julia Kristeva" (Summer 1999). Religious Education: An Interfaith Journal of Spirituality, Growth, and Transformation. 94 (3): 289–299.https://doi.org/10.1080/0034408990940304
- _____. "Maltese English and the Nativization Phase of the Dynamic Model" (June 2009). English Today. 25 (2): 25–32. https://doi.org/10.1017/S0266078409000157.
- _____. Carl L. Bankston, ed. "Language Issues." Encyclopedia of American Immigration (2010). Armonk, New York: M.E. Sharpe, 644–647. ISBN 0765680289.
- _____. "English in the Roman Catholic Liturgy 1969—2002" (December 2013). World Englishes. 32 (3): 429–442. https://doi.org/10.1111/weng.12042
- _____. Colleen D. Hartung, ed. "Bishop Barbara Lewis King." Women Advancing Knowledge Equity: The Parliament of the World Religions (2023). Chicago, Illinois: Parliament of the Worlds Religions, 136–151.

=== Book reviews ===
- Whelan, Winifred. "Harper's Encyclopedia of Religious Education, edited by Iris V. Cully and Kendig Brubaker Cully." The Cord: A Franciscan Spiritual Review (1990), 254–255.
- _____. "Mary Condren: The Serpent and the Goddess." Horizons: The Journal of the College Theology Society (Spring 1991). 18 (1), 148–149.
- _____. "Jane Kopas, Sacred Identity: Exploring a Theology of the Person." Horizons: The Journal of the College Theology Society (Fall 1995). 22 (2), 309–310.
- _____, "Ellen T. Armour, Deconstruction, Feminist Theology and the Problem of Difference: Subverting the Race/Gender Divide." Horizons: The Journal of the College Theology Society (Fall 2001). 28 (6): 361–362.
- _____. "Michael Glazier, The Gift Of The Church: A Textbook On Ecclesiology in Honor Of Patrick Granfield." Horizons: The Journal of the College Theology Society (Spring 2003). 30 (1):152—155.
- _____. "Peter Schafer, Mirror of His Beauty: Feminine Images of God from the Bible to the Kabbalah." Horizons: The Journal of the College Theology Society (Fall 2003). 30 (2), 343–344.
- _____. "Jane Schaberg, The Resurrection of Mary Magdalene: Legends, Apocrypha, and the Christian Testament." Horizons: The Journal of the College Theology Society (Fall 2004). 31 (2): 435–436.
- _____. "Alda Bathrop, Thoreau's Religion, Walden Woods, Social Justice, and the Politics of Asceticism." Cross Currents (2024).
- _____. "Colleen Hartung, ed. Claiming Notability for Women Activists in Religion." Cross Currents (June 2022). 72 (2): 167–170. doi:10.1353/cro.2022.0016.
- _____. "Kathleen McPhillips and Naomi Goldenberg, eds., The End of Religion: Feminist Reappraisals of the State." Reading Religion, American Academy of Religion, (April 2023).
- _____. "Thoreau's Religion: Walden Woods, Social Justice, and the Politics of Asceticism." Cross Currents (June 2024). 74 (2): 216–218. doi:10.1353/cro.2024.a951558
