= Cree (disambiguation) =

The Cree are a Native American ethnic group.

Cree may also refer to:

== People ==
- Cree (surname), including a list of people with the name
- Cree Cicchino (born 2002), American actress, also known mononymously as Cree
- Cree LeFavour (born 1965), American writer
- Cree Myles (fl. 2020s), American influencer
- Cree Summer (born 1969), American-Canadian actress

== Places ==
- Cree, County Clare, a village in Ireland
- Cree Lake, Canada
  - Cree Lake/Crystal Lodge (Midgett Field) Aerodrome and Cree Lake (Crystal Lodge) Water Aerodrome, airports in Saskatchewan
- Cree River, in Saskatchewan, Canada
- River Cree, in Scotland

== Other uses ==
- Air Creebec, callsign CREE, a regional airline in Quebec, Canada
- Wolfspeed, formerly Cree Inc., an America semiconductor manufacturer
- Cree language, a language spoken in Canada
  - Cree syllabics, are used to write Cree

== See also ==
- Kree (disambiguation)
- CREES, a Peruvian non profit and business collaboration
- St Katharine Cree, an Anglican church in the City of London
