= Loacker (surname) =

Loacker is a surname most common in Vorarlberg, Austria, and South Tyrol, Italy. Notable people with the surname include:

- Georgine Loacker (1926–2013), American assessment scholar
- Guido Loacker (born 1945), Austrian Olympic sports shooter
- Jürgen Loacker (born 1974), Austrian Olympic bobsledder

== See also ==
- Loacker, a South Tyrolean confectionery company
- SSV Bozen Loacker, a South Tyrolean men's handball club
