= Arleigh =

Arleigh may refer to:

- Arleigh Burke (1901–1996), admiral of the United States Navy
  - Arleigh Burke-class destroyer, a class of destroyers named after the lead ship
  - USS Arleigh Burke, the lead ship of the namesake class of destroyers
- Arleigh McCree (1939–1986), Officer in Charge of the Firearms and Explosives Unit of the Los Angeles Police Department
- Arleigh Winston Scott GCMG, GCVO 1900–1976 Governor-General of Barbados, (1967–1976)
