= Penny De Los Santos =

American culinary photographer

Penny De Los Santos is a culinary photographer, a senior contributor to Saveur Magazine, and a co-author of or a contributor to more than a dozen food and culture books.

== Early life ==
Santos was born in Germany to American parents. She moved to Texas, where she spent the rest of her adolescence. She graduated from Texas A&M University with a major in Journalism. In 1996, she earned a master's degree in Communications from Ohio University. She was a staff photographer at the San Jose Mercury News.

== Career ==
Since 2006, De Los Santos has been a senior contributing photographer for Saveur Magazine, traveling to more than 30 countries. In February 2009, De Los Santos launched a food blog, where she documents the food and culture in her travel destinations as well as her personal life. She regularly contributes to National Geographic, Sports Illustrated, Newsweek, Time, Latina and Texas Monthly.

== Personal life ==
De Los Santos is gay and is based in New York City. She is of Mexican heritage.

== Awards ==
- National Press Photographers Association College Photographer of the Year (1998)
- Parson’s School of Design Marty Fortier Fellowship
- California New Media Award
- National Geographic Photography Grant
- Recipient of the Prestigious World Press Joop Stewart Master Class

== Books ==
Penny De Los Santos has contributed to multiple books and co-authored five books related to food and culture :

- Asian Dumplings: Mastering Gyoza, Spring Rolls, Samosas, and More^{[}^{1]} by Andrea Nguyen and Penny De Los Santos.
- The New Steak: Recipes for a Range of Cuts plus Savory Sides by Cree LeFavour and Penny De Los Santos.
- The New Taste of Chocolate: A Cultural & Natural History of Cacao with Recipes by Maricel E. Presilla and Penny De Los Santos
- Mediterranean Vegetarian Feasts by Aglaia Kremezi and Penny De Los Santos
- Richard Sandoval's New Latin Flavors: Hot Dishes, Cool Drinks by Richard Sandoval and Penny De Los Santos
