= Food in Antarctica =

Culinary tradition

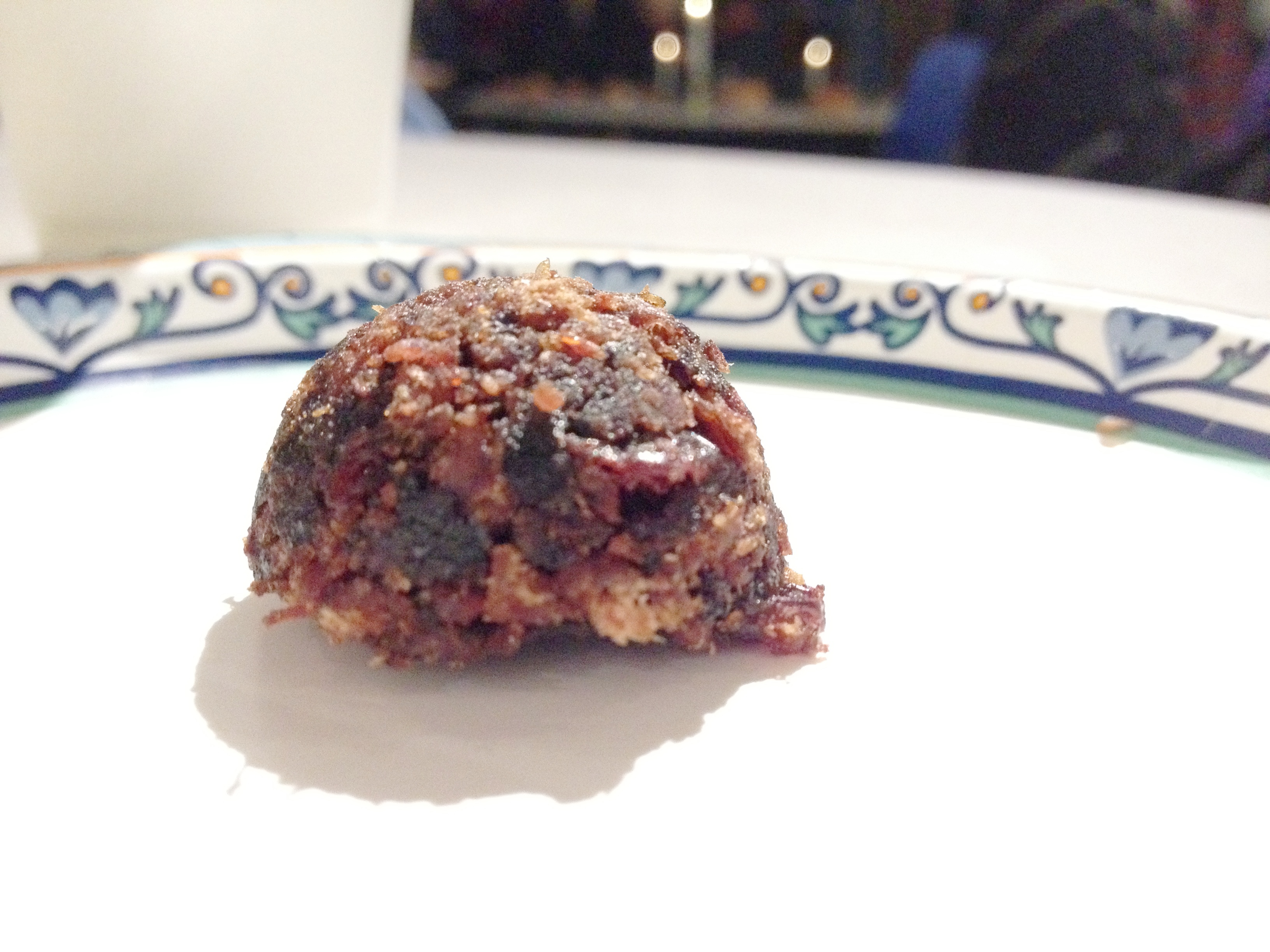
Pemmican

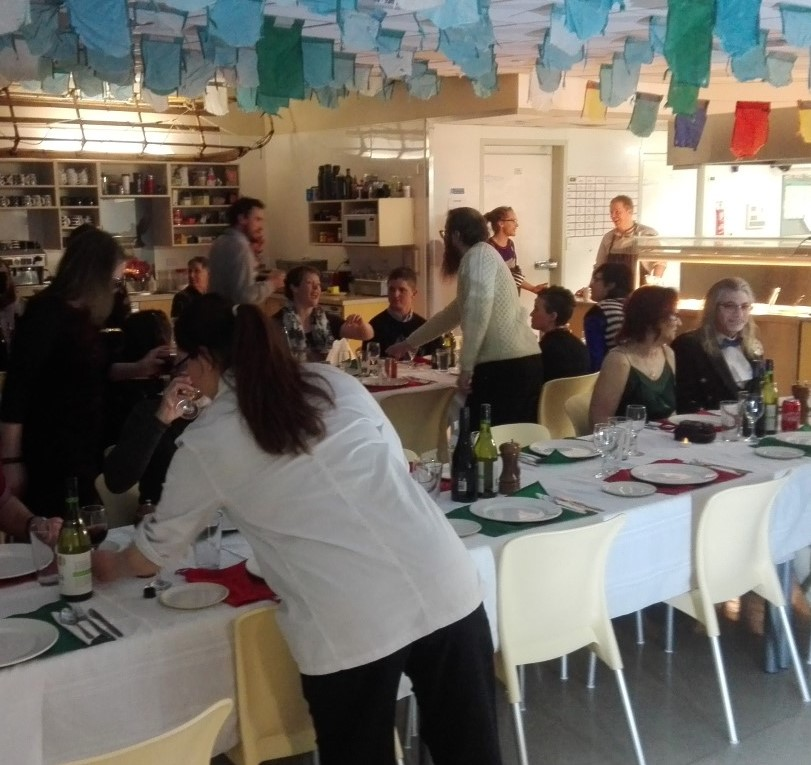
Midwinter Day banquet at Scott Base

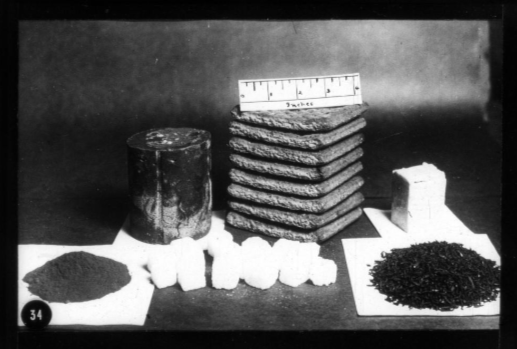
Historical photography of one day's sledging ration (Terra Nova Expedition)

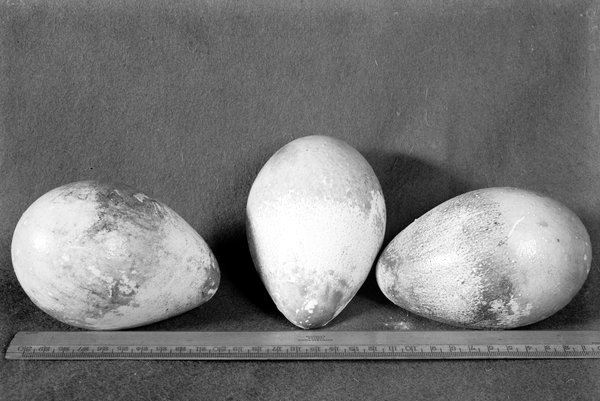
Emperor penguin eggs, historically eaten in Antarctica

Food in Antarctica is very important, and there are several dishes typical of the continent.

The vast majority of food is imported to Antarctica, as fishing and hunting other wild animals are prohibited. In the past, however, this ban did not apply, and for example, as late as the 1960s, penguin eggs were commonly eaten there. On some polar stations, small amounts of vegetables and herbs are grown. At polar stations, the cuisine typically reflects the country to which the station belongs. Explorers in the field usually have access to high-energy foods, such as chocolate.

At Australia's Casey Station, beer production took place from the 1990s; however, in 2021 this brewing was banned by the Australian government. At Amundsen-Scott South Pole Station, alcohol is available for purchase but rationed: "either a bottle of hard liquor, three bottles of wine, or a whole lot of weak beer" per week.

Cree LeFavour reported that during her time as a United States Antarctic Program at Amundsen-Scott from November 2023, she found food supplies with expiration dates as old as 2001. While supplies are stored at minus 70 degrees—cold enough to prevent bacterial breakdown of food—and LeFavour used most of the expired food she found, "I drew the line at eating Obama-era chicken". Fresh food was flown in from McMurdo Station: "'Weather delay' or 'mechanical delay' on the board meant no 'freshies'—what everyone called fresh fruit, vegetables, and dairy—for me to cook with". She made penguin cookies and cocoa-covered truffles for Christmas.

On Midwinter Day, the main Antarctic holiday, celebrated during the winter solstice on June 20 or 21, which has been observed since the early 20th century, many Antarctic research stations hold a festive multi-course banquet. Because there are no winter supply deliveries to the stations, the ingredients for this feast are usually brought in several months in advance. The banquet often features special delicacies not normally served at the stations, such as various alcoholic beverages, steak, or lobster. Before the ban on hunting Antarctic wildlife, Midwinter Day celebrations also included dishes made from the meat of local animals.

== Typical Antarctic food ==
- Pemmican, a mixture of dried meat, dried fruit, fat, and other ingredients. Originally from North American Indigenous peoples, it is popular among Antarctic explorers for its long shelf life and high energy value. Ernest Henry Shackleton also carried it on his expeditions.
- Sledging biscuits, plain, durable, buttery biscuits with high energy content, also very popular among Antarctic explorers. They can be served with cheese or various spreads such as marmite. They are usually part of a sledging ration.
- Hoosh, a porridge made from pemmican, sledging biscuits, and water (usually melted snow).
- Bannock, a simple, plain flatbread.
- Chocolate
