= McCree =

McCree is a Scottish surname. Notable people with the surname include:

- Arleigh McCree (1939–1986), American bomb disposal expert
- Floyd J. McCree (1923–1988), American politician
- Jimmy McCree (1902–1984), Scottish footballer
- J. Mallory McCree, American actor
- Kathleen McCree Lewis (1947–2007), American lawyer
- Logan McCree (born 1977), stage name of German men's rights activist Philipp Tanzer
- Marlon McCree (born 1977), American footballer
- Nathan McCree (born 1969), English music composer
- Wade H. McCree (1920–1987), American lawyer and judge

== Fictional characters ==
- Jesse McCree, the original name of Cole Cassidy, a character from the 2016 video game

== See also ==
- Mad Dog McCree, laserdisc video game
- Cree (surname)
