= Quadratini =

Wafer biscuits

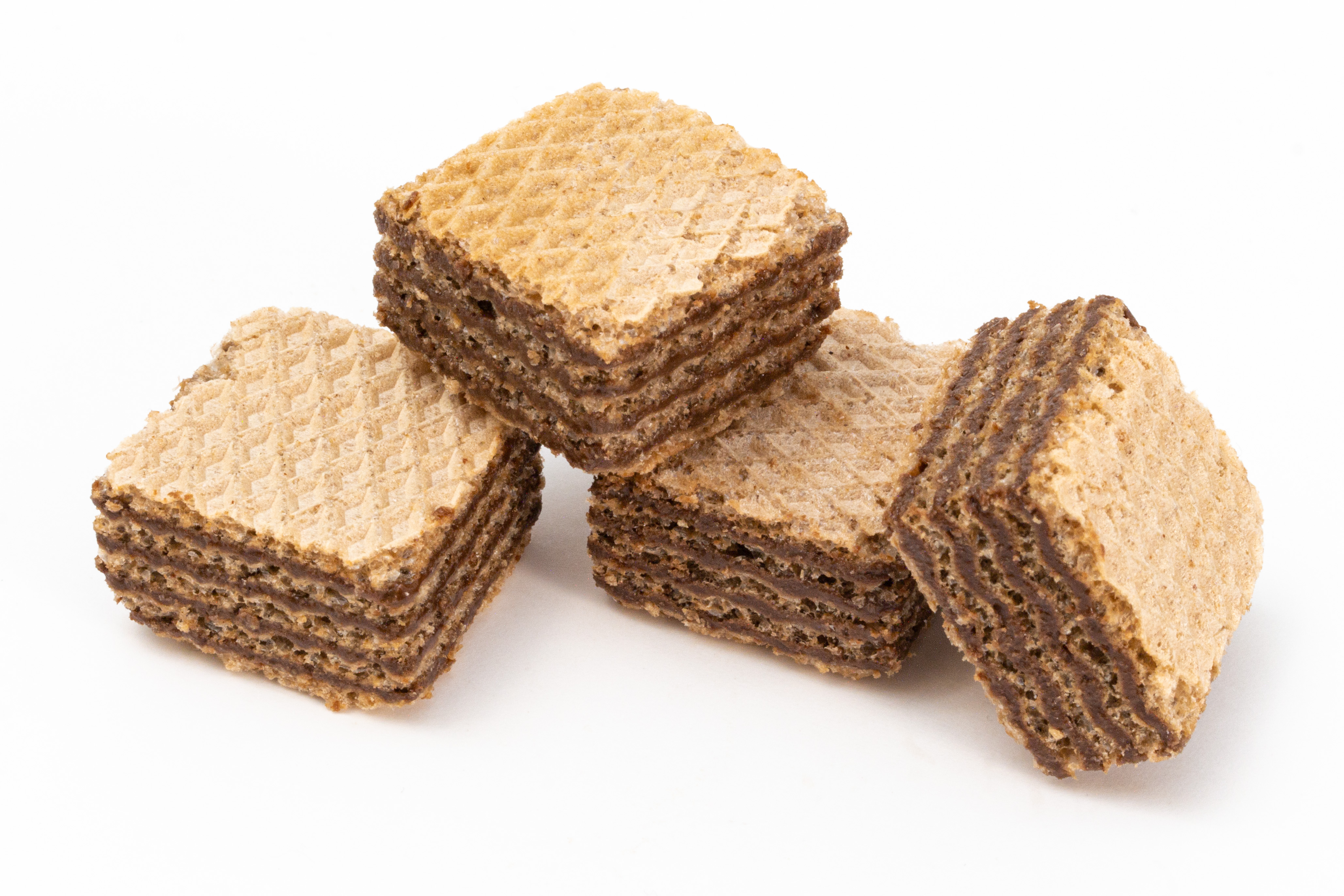
- Napolitaner (hazelnut) Quadratini
- Type: Biscuit
- Place of origin: Italy
- Created by: Loacker
- Invented: 1994

Quadratini (Italian for 'little squares') is an Italian brand of cube wafer biscuits with layered sheets. It is produced by the company Loacker, a business founded in 1925 in South Tyrol, Italy by Alfons Loacker.

== Production ==
Loacker SpA was founded in 1925 by Alfons Loacker, and Quadratini was introduced as a commercial product in 1994. A. Loacker AG headquarters are located in South Tyrol, Italy and the company has a production plant in Heinfels, Austria.

Quadratini is notable for the cookie's all-natural ingredients. Loacker brand advertises wafer cookies without additives.

== Varieties ==
- Hazelnut
- Chocolate
- Vanilla
- Dark Chocolate
- Cacao and Milk
- Double Chocolate
- Lemon
- Coconut
- Raspberry Yoghurt
- Blueberry Yoghurt
- Tiramisu
- Matcha – Green tea
- Cappuccino
- Espresso
- Gingerbread (Seasonal)
- Speculoos-Orange (Seasonal)
- Cheese
- Cinnamon (Seasonal)
- Peanut Butter
- Multigrain Hazelnut
- Multigrain Chocolate

== Design ==
Loacker features Quadratini in a trademarked resealable bag with nine servings of eight wafer biscuits each. Each biscuit is about 1 x 2 x 2 cm with five layers of wafer and four layers of cream flavor. In the U.S., Quadratini are often sold in natural food stores as they contain no artificial flavors, artificial colorings or preservatives and have 0 grams of trans fat.

== Trademark controversies ==
In 2003, Loacker's legal representatives filed a complaint with the Syrian Ministry of Supplies and subsequently the Lebanese Public Prosecutor for a suspected infringement and production of a trademarked product. A Syrian company was suspected of infringing, manufacturing and exporting large quantities of “Ghrnata Quadratini” using the same general appearance and design as the packages of the Loacker Quadratini product for a Lebanese importer that acted as the exporter to Saudi Arabia and neighboring countries.

Both the Syrian exporter and Lebanese importer were raided by the police under Seizure and Confiscation orders. The police confiscated more than four thousand cartons each containing 30 packages.

The two parties involved in the scandal agreed to sign a settlement that admitted to, apologized for, and agreed to stop further production of any product that would infringe on Loackers’ trademarks and rights.

A. Loacker SpA v. OHIM (28 January 2009) Applicant A. Loacker SpA of Ritten sought to annul the decision made by the Office for Harmonisation in the Internal Market, for trademarks and designs, to allow an applicant for a community trademark, Editrice Quadratum SpA., to obtain an Italian Trademark in Milan, Italy. The word in question was “quadratum” as A. Loacker SpA contested that the word infringed on their “quadratini”. The courts decided to uphold the application for Editrice Quadratum SpA.
