= Heinfels Castle =

Castle in Austria

Burg Heinfels
- Heinfels
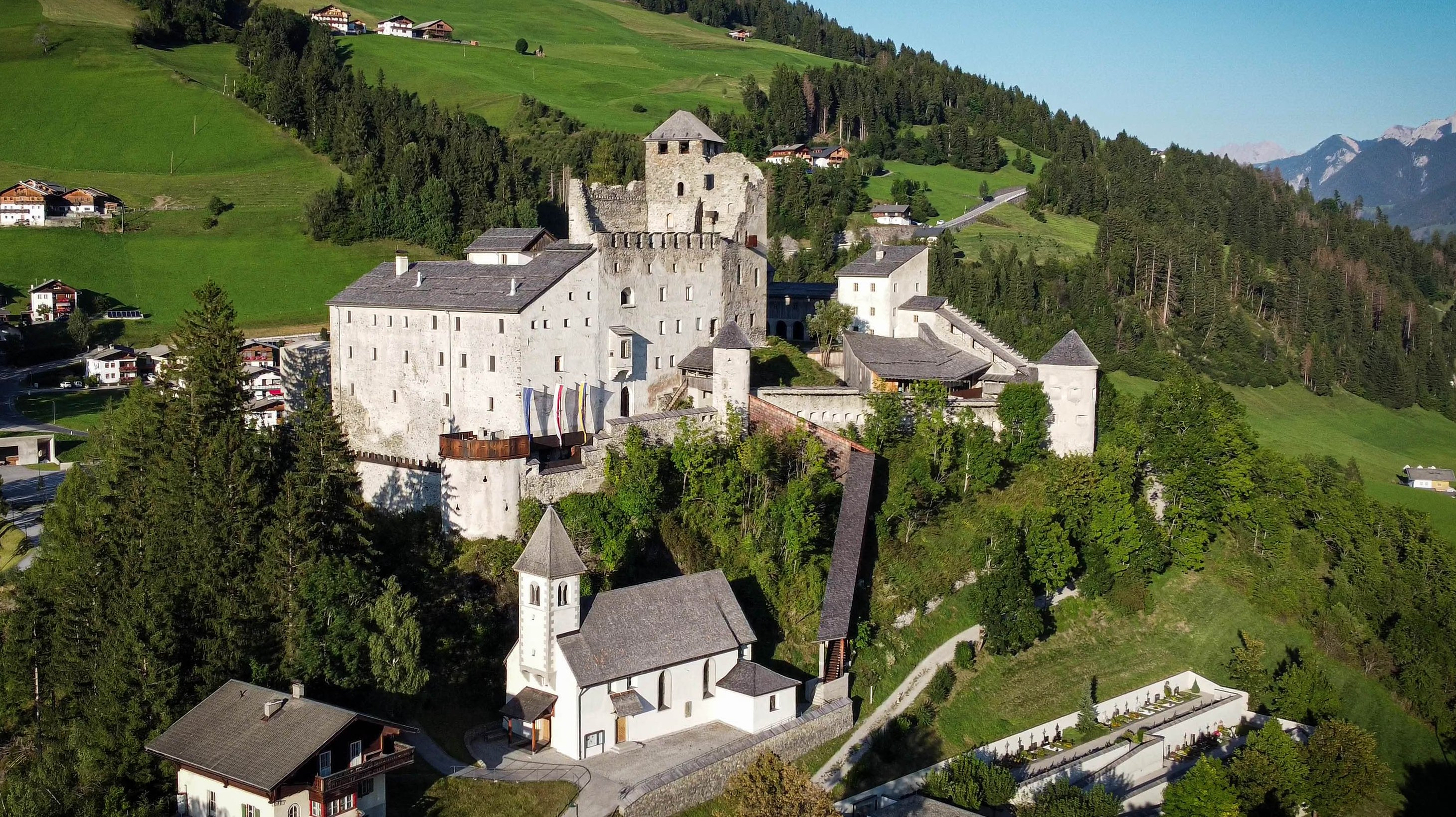
- Heinfels Castle, 2023

Site information
- Type: hill castle
- Code: AT-7
- Condition: largely preserved

Location
- Location within Austria
- Coordinates: 46°45′04″N 12°26′23″E
- Height: 1,130 m (AA)

Garrison information
- Occupants: ministeriales

Heinfels Castle is an extensive hilltop castle complex above Heinfels in East Tyrol. The strategically well-situated fortification at 1130 metres above sea level is a striking landmark of the eastern Puster Valley. From the castle you have a wide view up and down the Drau as well as into the Tyrolean Gailtal valley opposite.

== History ==
The legendary foundation by the Huns dates back to the 5th century. Until the 16th century, the castle was therefore referred to as ‘Huonenfels’, ‘Huonifels’, ‘Huenfels’ or ‘Heunfels’. For a long time, it was assumed in historical research that the castle was founded by the Avars. However, in the course of restoration work between 2016 and 2020, building research was able to prove that the oldest part of the castle, the keep, dates back to 1210.

In 1239, Otto Welf de Hunenvelse, who belonged to the older lords of Welsperg, is mentioned for the first time as a ministerial who named himself after the castle. The castle was first mentioned in documents in 1243 and was owned by Freising ministerials.

In the 13th century, the Counts of Gorizia acquired Heinfels Castle by inheritance and, from 1275 onwards, developed it into an important base, which was also the seat of a court. It is not known when the castle came into the possession of the Counts of Gorizia, but in a contract of the same year between the two Counts of Gorizia Meinhard II and Albert I, it was handed over to the latter. This means that the castle must have been in the possession of Gorizia before then.

In 1307, the castle, including the associated property and court, passed to Albert through an inheritance contract between Albert II and Heinrich III. The latter divided his inheritance among his sons during his lifetime.

In 1460, Count John II of Gorizia lost the dispute over the inheritance of the Counts of Cilli against Emperor Frederick III. He also lost his Carinthian possessions and the residence of Bruck as a result of the Peace of Pusarnitz. He then moved to Heinfels and chose it as his future residence. He subsequently expanded the castle into a residential fortress and built equally strong defences.

Due to the ongoing Venetian conflicts and the threat from the Turks, the castle was constantly being repaired and modernised. The population usually had to pay for this. This led to peasant uprisings. In 1525, the castle was temporarily occupied by the peasants. A year later, on 7 July 1526, the castle men were able to fend off another siege by a 2,000-strong peasant army led by Michael Gaismair.

In 1570, the Tyrolean sovereign Archduke Ferdinand II redeemed the pledge for Heinfels Castle. However, in 1581 he had to pledge the property again to the Bishopric of Brixen and the then Bishop Johann Thomas von Spaur.

In 1593, major building work was carried out, which largely gave the castle its present appearance.

In 1612, Archduke Maximilian III, known as the Deutschmeister, redeemed the pledged lordship of Heinfels and handed it over to Engelhard Dietrich von Wolkenstein-Trostburg. In a major fire on 15 January 1613, large parts of the castle were completely destroyed. Soon afterwards, the castle was rebuilt by the court chamber and the defences were extended due to the continuing Venetian threat.

Archduke Leopold V bought the estate back in 1629, but immediately pledged it to Hall Abbey. Following the bankruptcy of the pledge holders, the Royal Ladies' Abbey of Hall took over the castle in the same year. At first they only took over the lien, but in 1654 they acquired Heinfels by purchase. During this time, the condition of the castle deteriorated rapidly. An earthquake in 1714 caused further serious damage to the castle.

In 1783, Emperor Joseph II dissolved the convent, with the result that the entire property, including Heinfels, fell to the state. 50 years later, the empty castle was sold to the municipalities of the Sillian judicial district, with the exception of Innichen. In the meantime, the building was leased to Baron Ertl from Graz.

In 1880, however, a company of the Kaiserjäger moved into Heinfels. They used the castle as barracks until 1910, which meant that it was badly damaged. As a result, the roof of the Romanesque keep collapsed in the snowy winter of 1917. Finally, in 1932, the western wall of the Palas collapsed. The chapel bay and the stair tower were severely damaged.

Four years later, in 1936, Heinfels Castle was auctioned off to the market town of Sillian. On 26 August of the same year, the municipality sold the castle to the local businessman Alois Stallbaumer. He tried to use his financial means to save the castle from further decay. In his will, he bequeathed the castle to the Jesuit College in Innsbruck in 1974. In 1977 it was acquired by the Viennese lawyer Max Villgrattner.

In 1999, extensive restoration work was carried out and a new hipped roof was added to the wide battlements of the keep.

In 2005, after Villgrattner's death, his daughter sold the castle to the South Tyrolean entrepreneurial Loacker family. The Loacker family runs a confectionery factory in Heinfels. The purchase price was not disclosed.

== Building ==
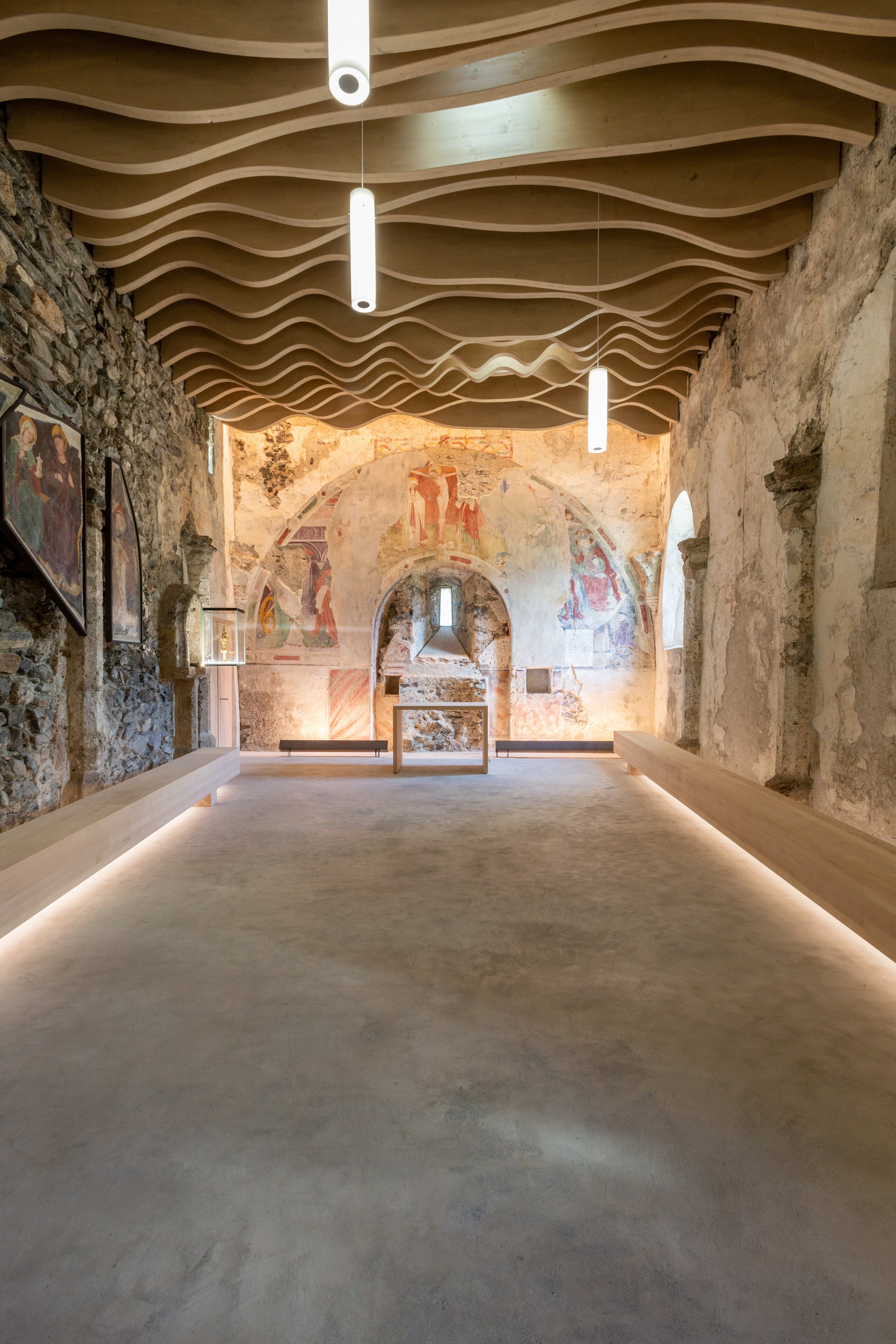
St. Laurent's chapel, Heinfels Castle, after completion of the restoration work, 2020

Heinfels Castle consists of three building groups. The oldest part dates back to the 13th century and was built on the rocky hilltop as a stronghold. To the west of the keep are several buildings from the end of the 15th and the beginning of the 16th century. Together they form the castle courtyard. There was a cistern in the centre of the castle courtyard, but this was declared dilapidated as early as 1535. The core of the medieval castle complex is the 20 metre high keep. The Palas was added to this in the 13th century. The southern part of this residential tower was built later. This is the chapel wing. This was adapted to the late Gothic style in the second half of the 15th century. This section of the castle is now very dilapidated.

The western core castle is still in a better state of preservation today. In the south-east corner of the castle courtyard is the stair tower, which connects the medieval buildings with those from the 15th and 16th centuries. This has been partially damaged since the partial collapse of the Palas in 1932.

The largest part of the castle is the western wing, which extends over the entire west side. Loggia corridors were built in the inner courtyard in the 16th century. The cellars of the wing also served as a prison at times. On the ground floor was the Dürnitz, which served as a residence for the staff. The centrepiece of the west wing is a large hall with stucco decoration from the 18th century. This is now known as the Knights' Hall.

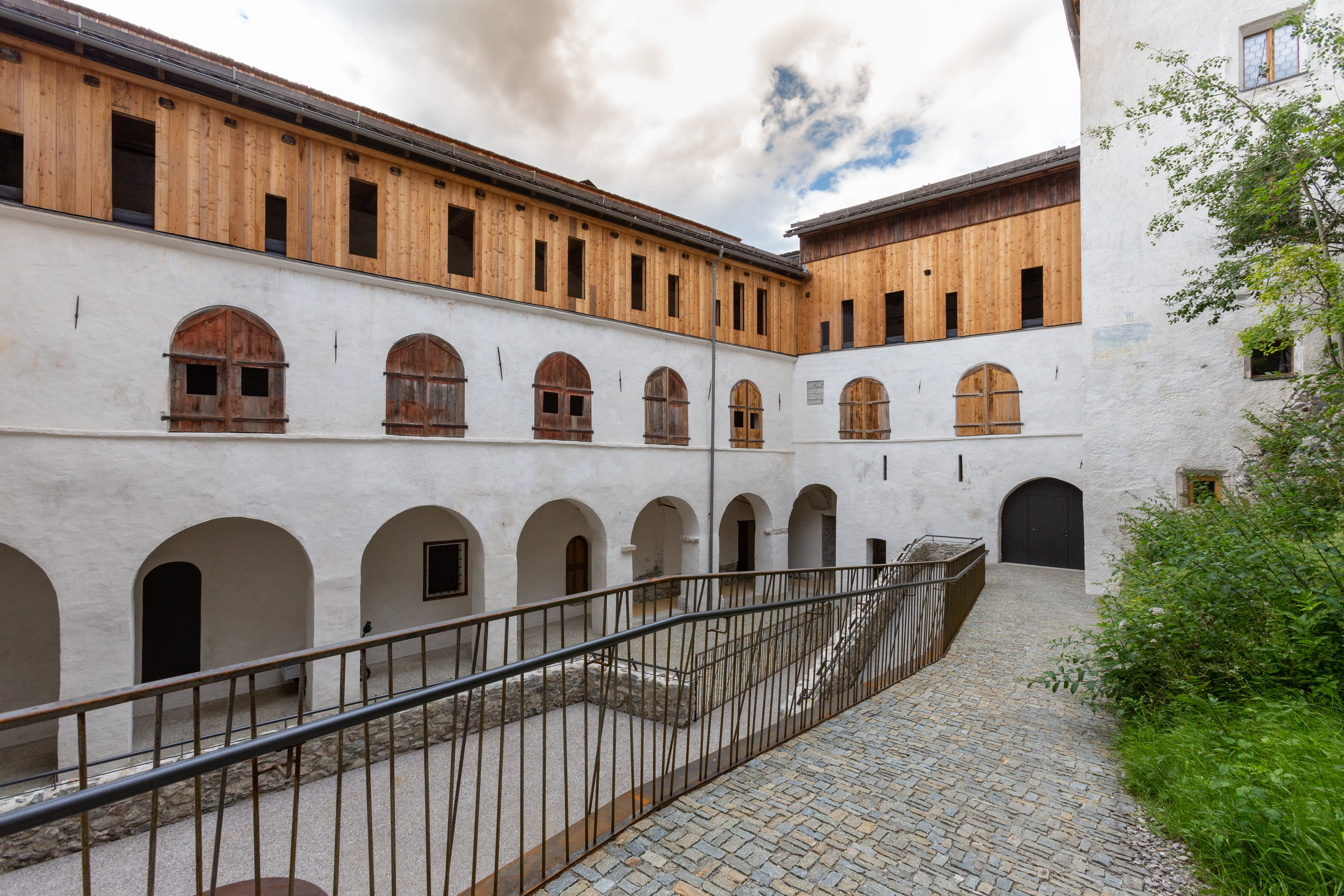
Heinfels Castle, inner courtyard

The castle centre is surrounded by an enclosing wall, which was built by the Gorizia family around 1460. This also included the extensive outer bailey. Nothing of the medieval outer bailey remains today. A century later, the curtain wall was extended and reinforced after the castle fire. It is reinforced with roundels and round towers and equipped with a total of 38 embrasures for small arms on the south and east sides, the most vulnerable points for attacks. The castle gate was additionally secured with a Pechnase.

== Today's use ==
In September 2010, significant parts of the castle were opened to the public for the first time in decades. More than 1,200 people visited Heinfels Castle as part of the Austria-wide Monument Day. The castle had been closed to the public since 2012 due to its desolate condition. The intention was then to renovate the castle together with the new owner and make it accessible to the public again. In September 2014, the ‘Heinfels Castle Museum Association’ was founded to plan the basic renovation and develop a utilisation concept in cooperation with the Federal Monuments Office, the Province of Tyrol (Provincial Memorial Foundation) and the local communities. The medieval castle complex in Heinfels in East Tyrol was revitalised at a cost of eight million euros between 2016 and 2020. Since summer 2020, it has been used as a 1000 m² museum. The castle restaurant, the Kulinarium Burg Heinfels, opened in the west wing at the end of April 2026, with a bistro for day visitors and dinners in the old tavern.

== See also ==
- List of castles in Austria
