= Marion Verhaalen =

American composer (1930–2020)

Marion Verhaalen (9 December 1930 – 16 March 2020) was an American composer, music educator, musicologist, and nun who published books about Latin American composers and music.

== Life and career ==
Verhaalen was born in Milwaukee, the fifth child of Carl and Aǵnes Sieberlich Verhaalen. She played accordion and piano by ear as a child, before beginning music lessons at age 12. She started composing organ preludes and interludes in high school. Verhaalen joined the School Sisters of St. Francis in 1949 under the name Sister Mary Vernon, and earned a B.M. in piano at Alverno College; M.M. in piano at Catholic University; and Ed.D. in music education at the Columbia University Teachers College. Her dissertation, which was later published, was entitled The Solo Piano Music of Francisco Mignone and Camargo Guarnieri.

Verhaalen received two scholarships from the Teachers College in 1968 and 1969. She received a research grant from the Organization of American States to study composers Francisco Mignone and Camargo Guarnieri in Brazil in 1969. She was named the Outstanding Milwaukee Musician in 1980 by the Wisconsin Federation of Music Clubs.

Verhaalen worked as a teaching assistant to Dr. Robert Pace at Teachers College from 1967 to 1969. Later, she presented music education workshops sponsored by the National Piano Foundation, and worked as a staff editor for Musart Magazine. She taught at the Elm School for the Creative Arts for 19 years, as well as at Alverno College, the Wisconsin Conservatory of Music, (I) and the Cardinal Stritch University. She developed a piano course for Milwaukee public schools, which was published as Keyboard Dimensions I, II, III, and IV. Verhaalen also made 11 trips to Brazil, spending a total of 3 years there.

Towards the end of her life, Verhaalen said, "Music has been a powerful ministry for me." The Marion Verhaalen Collection on Camargo Guarnieri and Twentieth Century Brazilian Music is archived at the Benson Latin American Collection at the University of Texas at Austin.

Verhaalen's music was published by GIA Publications, Hal Leonard, Lee Roberts Music Publications Inc., Summy-Birchard, and Theodore Presser Company. Her publications include:

== Books ==
- Camargo Guarnieri, Brazilian Composer: A Study of His Creative Life and Works
- (The) Solo Piano Music of Francisco Mignone and Camargo Guarnieri

== Chamber ==
- Samba (guitar)

== Dance ==
- Four Dances of Affliction (flute, violin and piano)
- Haves and Have Nots (percussion and piano)

== Piano/Organ ==
- Keyboard Dimensions I, II, III, and IV
- organ arrangements and compositions
- piano arrangements and compositions
- Three Postludes (organ)

== Theater ==
- Under the Greenwood Tree (children's chorus, piano, flute, clarinet and strings)

== Vocal ==
- Imaginary Invalid (text by Moliere; chorus and piano)
- Judith: An Oratorio (four soloists, chorus and chamber orchestra)
- On the Seashore of Endless Worlds (text by Rabindranath Tagore; soprano, string quartet, string bass, flute and bassoon)
- Prairie Woman Song Cycle (text by Tom Montag)
- Text of St. Paul (chorus and electric tape)
