= Georgine Loacker =

Georgine Loacker, S.S.S.F. (May 27, 1926 – August 3, 2013) was an American assessment scholar who founded the Alverno College ability-based curriculum.

== Biography ==
Georgine Loacker, S.S.S.F. was born and raised in Chicago, Illinois. She graduated from Alverno College in 1946 and began working at the college in 1957. She left temporarily while she completed her doctorate in English from the University of Chicago. She worked with a team of Alverno College faculty in the early 1970s to develop Alverno's ability-based curriculum.
