= María Rosa Leggol =

Franciscan religious sister (1926–2014)

Sister María Rosa Leggol O.S.F.
- Born: November 21, 1926; Puerto Cortés, Honduras
- Died: October 16, 2020 (aged 93); Tegucigalpa, Honduras
- Known for: Founding Sociedad Amigos de los Niños

María Rosa Leggol, O.S.F., (November 21, 1926 – October 16, 2020) was a Franciscan religious sister who has been called the "Mother Teresa of Honduras." In the 1960s, she organized a group of homes to care for the abandoned and deprived children of that nation, which became organized as the Sociedad Amigos de los Niños (SAN). Through the organization, she educated over 40,000 orphans across fifty years.

== Life ==
=== Early life ===
María Rosa Leggol was born on 21 November 1926 in Puerto Cortés, Honduras, a major port of Central America. After her French Canadian father abandoned her family before her first birthday, her native mother placed her in an orphanage, where she spent her childhood. At the age of six, she encountered two School Sisters of St. Francis (abbreviated in the United States as S.S.S.F), the congregation which she would later join. Having never seen religious sisters before, she asked a local Catholic priest about the women. Once he had explained the idea of consecrated life to her, Leggol immediately determined that it was the life she wished to follow. Later, at the age of nine, Leggol prayed to the Blessed Virgin Mary to help her locate those sisters so she could begin her new life. As she left the church, she spotted a train arriving with two School Sisters of St. Francis on board.

=== Franciscan sisters ===
Leggol grew to know the School Sisters of St. Francis, who had come from Germany to serve in Honduras, and repeatedly sought to enter the congregation. However, because she only had five years of formal education, the sisters were hesitant to accept her. After much effort and perseverance, Leggol was accepted by the School Sisters in 1948 at the age of 21. They brought her to the United States to begin her formation in the novitiate of their American province, based in Milwaukee, Wisconsin. By an interesting coincidence, she entered with an American, Diane Drufenbrock, who became a member of the Socialist Party USA in 1976 and ran as their candidate for Vice President of the United States in the 1980 presidential election. They and the rest of their class completed their year of formation and made their profession on 13 June 1949.

== Career ==
=== Start ===
After her profession, María Rosa Leggol was sent back to Honduras and assigned to work in a hospital in the capital, Tegucigalpa. Assigned as the night shift supervisor, Leggol developed a reputation as a committed caregiver. As a former orphan, she was especially concerned for the city's poorest children, many of whom had jailed parents. Since entire families were frequently imprisoned, children would be left without education and exposed to potential abuse.

By the early 1960s, María Rosa Leggol decided that she would need to start any movement that could effectively aid local children. While still working at night, the Sister started using her daytime hours to seek locations for a home for the children. After identifying a neighborhood designated as low-income housing, she registered for 10 homes without any personal assets. Leggol obtained the permission of the Provincial Superior in Milwaukee to proceed with the project, but failed to advise the Mother Superior of her convent about it. Only when the developer called the convent, seeking the down payment for the houses, did the Superior learn about the plan, at which point she made it clear to Leggol that she would have to find the funding entirely on her own.

Through the tip of a grateful patient, she learned of grants being made available by President John F. Kennedy's Alliance for Progress, established to help the people of Latin America. After gaining sponsorships from many business leaders, she earned enough grant funds and purchased the homes. Even these homes reached their initial capacity, she continued to take in children from a local penitentiary, receiving beds from a local sponsor and food from the United States Air Force.

=== SAN ===
María Rosa Leggol took in the first group of children in 1964. In 1966, she founded Sociedad Amigos de los Niños (SAN) to progressively increase shelters for Honduras' children, a population which is neglected, abandoned, abused, and orphaned at one of the highest rates in the Western Hemisphere. Scattered across Honduras, SAN currently has group homes for over 160 children, an agricultural training center for teenage boys, schools, and a hospital.

As news of SAN's operations spread, Leggol was inundated with children she rescued from prisons, orphans referred by social services, and abandoned or street kids that walked long distances on the rumor of a meal and a bed from the "nun who helps children." The Austrian charity S.O.S. Kinderdorff asked Sister Maria Rosa to collaborate in building hundreds more children's homes in Honduras, as well as throughout Central and South America. While she used their financial support of roughly $500,000 per year to improve housing, she eventually deemed their regulations too restrictive for effective care, cutting ties in 1989 and fundraising on her own.

During the devastation in Honduras caused by Hurricane Fifi in 1974, which killed up to 10,000 Hondurans, Leggol and her staff went house to house, evacuating people from the flooding. When she heard a distant child's cries, she swam until she found the baby sleeping on a mattress floating in the flood waters, bringing it back to safety.

Leggol served as the director of the society until her death on 16 October 2020.

The following charitable organizations are supporters of SAN, providing donations, organizing brigades, and sponsoring the orphaned children:

- Campbell Webster Foundation
- Friends of Honduran Children
- Hope for Honduran Children
- Honduran Children Rescues Fund
- Virtu

== Hospitalization from COVID-19 and death ==
Sister María Rosa Leggol was hospitalized and tested positive for COVID-19 on 10 July 2020. She was released to recover at home on 18 August 2020. She died that October.

== Honors ==
- Marquette University- Honoris Causa, an honorary Doctor of Humane Letters in 2009 "for exemplifying the spirit of magis and being a woman for others," on the occasion of the 60th anniversary of her profession.
- The Good Samaritan Award in 1977, given by the National Catholic Development Conference in New York City to "individuals who have devoted themselves to good work through humanitarian love."
- University of Saint Francis Xavier of Antigonish, Canada - Honoris Causa
- A postage stamp was issued in her honor by the government of Honduras in recognition of her enormous efforts on behalf of the children.

== Film ==
A documentary film about the life and legacy of Sister Maria Rosa Leggol, WITH THIS LIGHT, was released in 2022. In the documentary, produced by Miraflores Films, audiences see the effects of her work through the lives of Maria and Rosa, two teens in her programs who dare to dream of a better future. This film features interviews with Maria Rosa Leggol prior to her death, interviews with students, parents, and teachers of SAN, and extensive archival footage of Sister Maria Rosa Leggol throughout the years. It was executive produced by Jessica P. Sarowitz, produced by Nicole Bernardi-Reis, and co-directed by Nicole Bernardi-Reis and Laura Bermúdez. WITH THIS LIGHT was awarded the Jury Prize for documentary films at the Austin Film Festival 2022 and was an official selection of Houston Latino Film Festival 2023, Pan African Film Festival 2023, and the St. Louis International Film Festival 2022. The film was accompanied by a robust impact campaign, which included screenings at the Vatican, the UN, RFK Human Rights Foundation, Dolores Huerta Life of Service Celebration, among others. It premiered in theaters in Honduras in April 2023 and ran in select theaters in New York, Los Angeles, Chicago (Highland Park), Houston, and New Orleans in August 2023, and then various on demand platforms.
