= Heinfels =

- Municipality
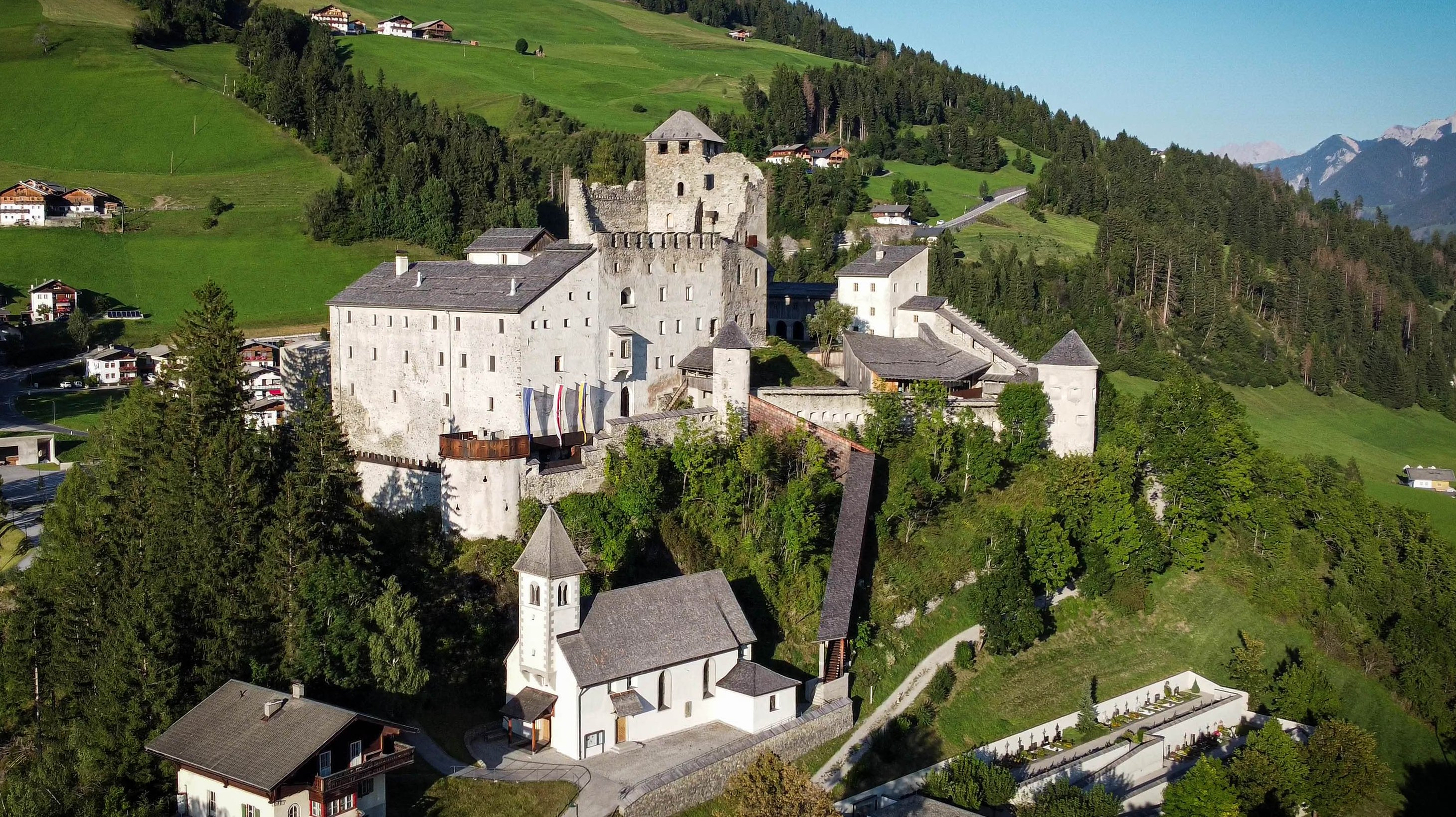
- Heinfels Castle

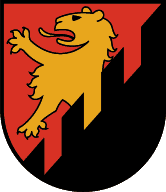
- Coat of arms

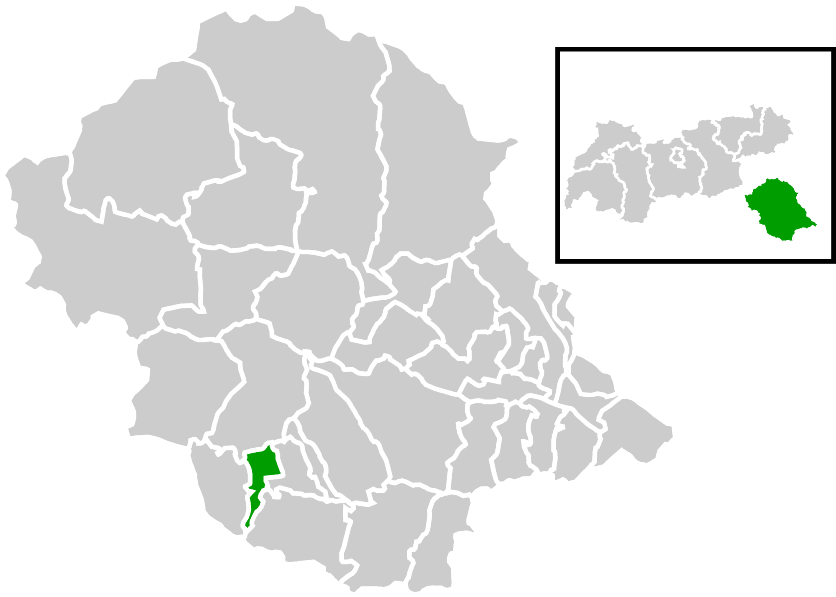
- Location within Lienz district

- Location within Austria
- Coordinates: 46°45′40″N 12°26′23″E
- Country: Austria
- State: Tyrol
- District: Lienz

Government
  - Mayor: Georg Hofmann (ÖVP)

Area
  - Total: 14.58 km^{2} (5.63 sq mi)
- Elevation: 1,078 m (3,537 ft)

Population (2018-01-01)
  - Total: 977
  - Density: 67.0/km^{2} (174/sq mi)
- Time zone: UTC+1 (CET)
  - Summer (DST): UTC+2 (CEST)
- Postal code: 9920
- Area code: 04842
- Vehicle registration: LZ
- Website: www.heinfels.at

Heinfels is a municipality in the district of Lienz in the Austrian state of Tyrol. It is most known as the site of Burg Heinfels, and the gateway to the Loacker factory.

== Population ==
Historical population
Year	Pop.	±%
1869	499	—
1880	624	+25.1%
1890	534	−14.4%
1900	482	−9.7%
1910	548	+13.7%
1923	501	−8.6%
1934	549	+9.6%
1939	562	+2.4%
1951	615	+9.4%
1961	609	−1.0%
1971	650	+6.7%
1981	760	+16.9%
1991	905	+19.1%
2001	997	+10.2%
2011	1,007	+1.0%
