= Dirnitz =

Heatable area in medieval castles

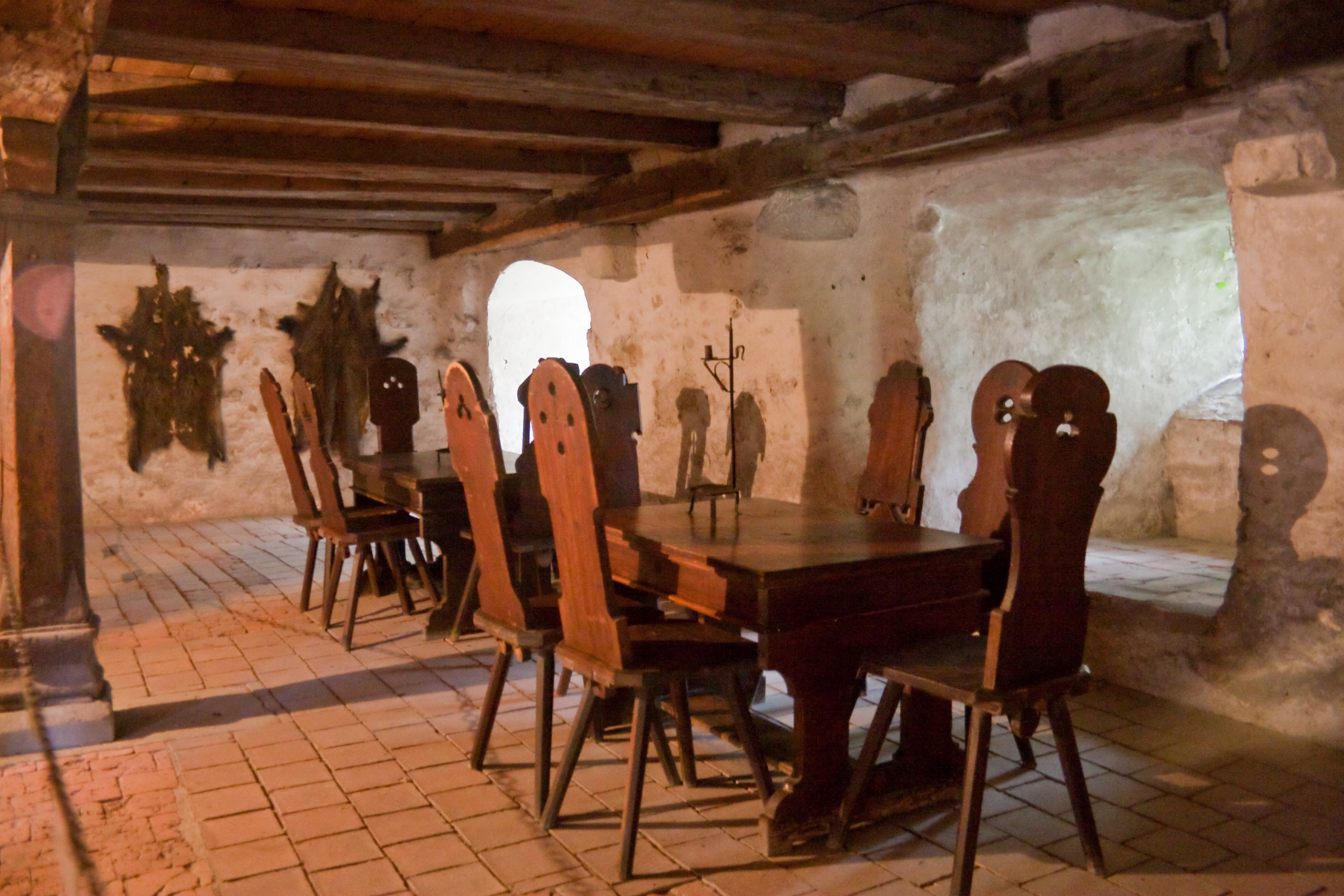
The dirnitz at Meersburg Castle

A dirnitz (German: Dürnitz or Türnitz, from the Slavic dorniza = "heated parlour", Danish: dørns, North Frisian: dörnsch or dörnsk) or Knights' Hall was the heatable area of a medieval castle. It was usually a single large room on the ground floor of the palas below the great hall. It was often expensively furnished and had a decorative vault. Occasionally it also described the cabinet (Kemenate) or an entire hall building. The term is German.

From the mid-15th century, the dirnitz, if used as a reception or gathering room or as a courtroom, was sometimes also called a courtroom (Hofstube).

Typical examples of a dirnitz may be seen at the Wartburg and Heinfels Castle. The dirnitz at Burghausen Castle is one of the rare examples where the heatable hall is on an upper storey.

== Literature ==
- Horst Wolfgang Böhme, Reinhard Friedrich, Barbara Schock-Werner (ed.): Wörterbuch der Burgen, Schlösser und Festungen. Philipp Reclam, Stuttgart, 2004, ISBN 3-15-010547-1, p. 113.
