= Kree (disambiguation) =

The Kree are a fictional species in Marvel Comics.

Kree may also refer to:

- Kree Woods, American singer-songwriter
- Kree Harrison, American singer, American Idol contestant
- Martin Kree, German footballer
- KREE (FM), a radio station (88.1 FM) licensed to serve Pirtleville, Arizona, United States

== See also ==
- Cree (disambiguation)
