= Cree (surname) =

Cree is a surname which has several separate origins in England, Scotland and Ireland. It occurs in all those countries today and also in Australia, Canada, New Zealand and the United States. It is of Medium Frequency in Scotland and Northern Ireland (using the benchmarks of the Guild of One-Name Studies).

== Cree surname research ==
Prior to 1989 a few people had already researched their individual Cree ancestry in the UK (notably Brigadier Hilary Cree in Devon and members of the Yorkshire and Glasgow Cree lines). Robert H Cree in the US had spent a lifetime researching five Cree lines emanating from western Pennsylvania in the late 18th century. Cree surname research started in earnest in the UK in 1989 with the publication by Trevor Cree of a booklet listing all Cree entries from the Indexes to Birth, Marriages and Deaths (1837–1980) for England and Wales. Entries from the 1988 IGI (International Genealogical Index) were also included. The surname is registered with the Guild of One-Name Studies.

This triggered further genealogical research by several UK researchers. Trevor Cree continued his index extracts with the Scottish (Cree 1992) and Irish civil registrations. Development was boosted when it was realised that the spelling CRIE had been the normal spelling of the name in Scotland in the 17th and 18th centuries.

Mike Spathaky traced the Derbyshire-Nottinghamshire CREE lines to a single progenitor born in 1644, showing that the line was independent of the Scottish Crees. He then researched the Scottish Cree, Crie and Cre lines and discovered a likely ancestor for them, a merchant who lived in Perth in 1459.

The Cree Family History Society was started in 1991 and reached membership of over 100 by 1999. Conferences were held in Dorset in 1993 and Perth in 1995 and 17 issues of CREE NEWS were published. The Society published five booklets on Cree family history written by members of the Society. The Society was replaced in 2000 by an informal network based on the Cree One-Name Study web site to which was added in 2012 a discussion forum, the Cree Family History Network web site.

== Variants ==
The earliest known form of the name is OF CRE (1459) which developed into CRE (1544) and briefly CREY around 1570. CRIE became the normal spelling in Scotland from about 1600 to 1800 and still survives in a line which was in Maine USA before 1800. Today the spelling CREE is universal throughout the UK apart from an area of NE Scotland where CHREE is a variant that is still current, but may be a separate surname unrelated to CREE. English and Irish lines have usually used the spelling CREE. CREA in County Down is thought to be a variant of CREE. The possible relationship of CRY in the Isle of Man to Cree is the subject of speculation at present.

== Origin of the surname ==
It is likely that the Scottish CREE surname derives from a place name, probably Crieff (Perthshire) or Creich (Fife). The English name CREE derives from a surname change between the baptism of James, the son of Alexander MACKREE, in 1644, and James's marriage as James CREE in 1678. It seems likely that one Irish line (now in England) first appeared as a variant of the Irish name CREAGH, probably in County Clare, Ireland. A separate CREE line from Kent traces back to a Huguenot immigrant named Pierre Jacob Carré. There are also a few minor origins of the name, such as the fifteen or so foundlings named after St Katherine Creechurch in the City of London.

== The Clan Cree Society ==
The Clan Cree Society was founded in 1878 by Charles Edward Cree. He also registered the Cree of Castle Stewart tartan with the London Highland Society at a time when there were only 100 registered tartans. The Clan Cree Society is not a genealogical society, but seeks to maintain family and Scottish traditions, particularly with Crees living outside Scotland.

== Castle Stewart ==
Castle Stewart, on the banks of the River Cree, has had a long association with the family. On the basis of his belief in this historic connection, in 1787, Robert Stewart purchased the Castle Stewart Estate for his mother, Christan Cree (daughter of Patrick Cree, the Lord Provost of Perth). Robert later sold the estate but kept the castle and the Baronial title. He was painted by Sir Henry Raeburn as Robert Stewart of Castle Stewart, a Baronial title he and his family kept for several generations.

Charles Edward Cree leased the castle in the 1890s and his grandson, Charles Cree, acquired the castle in 1969. He also held the title, the Baron of Bearcrofts (Registry of Scots Nobility). The castle is now owned by his son Anthony, who is the current Baron of Bearcrofts.

== Some notable historic Cree individuals ==
- James Crie (1639–1710) and his sons James (c. 1698 – c. 1760) and Patrick (1683–1754), who were all provosts (equivalent to English mayors) of Perth, Scotland, in the 17th and 18th centuries, and had dealings with the Jacobite leaders during their occupation of the city during the 1715 and 1745 Jacobite risings.
- John Cree (1707–1796), nurseryman and Procurator-Fiscal of Biggar, Lanarkshire, and his descendants, who were civic leaders in Biggar and innovators in plant propagation;
- John Cree (c1752-1795), originally of Ireland, who made his fortune in the East India trade, was granted arms and bought a country estate in Dorset;
- Edward H Cree RN (1814–1901), who sailed the seven seas as a naval surgeon for thirty years at the height of British Imperial Power. His diaries and paintings form a unique historical record of British Imperialism;
- Jessie Cree (1840–1925), who kept a seaboard diary during her three-month voyage from Scotland in 1861 to start a new life in New Zealand.

== Frequency of the name ==
There were 955 people with the surname Cree in Britain on Census night, 3 April 1881. 400 of these were in England, 9 in Wales and 546 in Scotland. In round figures therefore, about 42% of British Crees were living in England, 1% in Wales and 57% in Scotland. But when we take into account the much lower total population of Scotland compared to England, we find that the name had a frequency over ten times greater in Scotland than in England. The actual frequency of the name Cree in each country of Britain (as percentage of total population) was (in 1881):

- England 0.0016% or 16 per million of population
- Wales 0.0006% or 6 per million of population
- Scotland 0.015% or 150 per million of population
- Great Britain 0.0031% or 31 per million of population

Using the benchmarks of the Guild of One-Name Studies, the name Cree was therefore Rare in Wales in 1881, of Low Frequency in England, and of Medium Frequency in Scotland. It was of Low Frequency over Great Britain as a whole. The 1881 Census for Ireland is unavailable but figures derived from telephone directories suggest that Cree is of Medium Frequency in Northern Ireland and Rare in the Republic of Ireland. Cree is of Low Frequency in Australia (22.4), New Zealand (30.2), United States (12.3) and Canada (19.8). The name CRIE also occurs in France but is probably Rare in that country.

== Distribution of the name ==
Based on 1881 census records, the name Cree was of Medium Frequency in ten British counties, of which nine are in Scotland, headed by Ayrshire and Perthshire. Dunbartonshire is next and Nottinghamshire (the only English county in the top ten) fourth. Census data for Ireland is not available, but we know that most Irish Cree families live in County Down. Data for the USA suggests that the surname Cree gained Medium Frequency in Pennsylvania by 1850, to which Iowa and New York could be added in 1880.

== Notable members ==
- Alison Cree, New Zealand herpetologist
- Birdie Cree (1882–1942), American baseball player
- Gordon Cree (born 1977), Scottish musician
- Janet Cree (1910–1992), British painter
- Leslie Cree (born 1941), Northern Irish politician
- Sam Cree (1928–1980), Northern Irish playwright
- Thomas Cree (1914–1990), Australian rower

== See also ==
- Michael Crees (born 1983), British racing driver
- McCree
- Cree (disambiguation)
