= Mary Corona Wirfs =

American nun and educator (1886–1964)

Mother Mary Corona Wirfs OSF
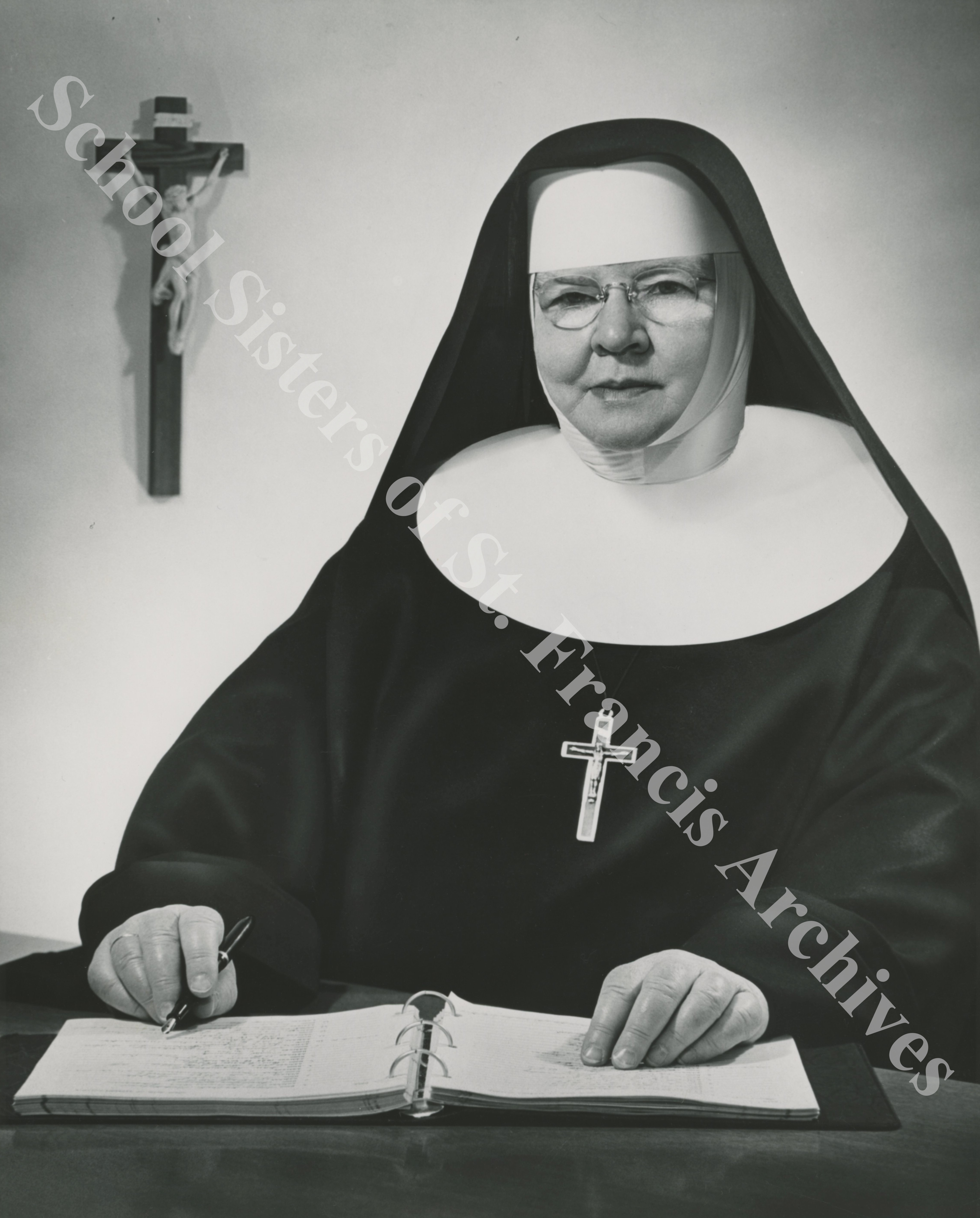
- Title: Superior General

Personal life
- Born: Catherine Wilhelmina Wirfs; June 1, 1886 Chicago, Illinois, U.S.
- Died: January 6, 1964 (aged 77) Milwaukee, Wisconsin, U.S.
- Known for: Catholic education
- Occupation: Architect; builder

Religious life
- Religion: Catholic
- Institute: School Sisters of St. Francis

Senior posting
- Period in office: 1942–1960
- Predecessor: Mother M. Stanislaus, OSF
- Successor: Mother M. Clemens, OSF

Mary Corona Wirfs OSF (born Catherine Wilhelmina Wirfs; June 1, 1886 – January 6, 1964) was an American nun, educator, administrator, and Superior General of the School Sisters of St. Francis. Wirfs worked behind the scenes to build and staff two hospitals and two high schools, and organized staffing for approximately 37 schools and hospitals. From her initial election in 1942 until her death in 1964, she worked for Catholic school education at the elementary, high school, and college education levels. Mother Corona, as she was called in her order, was "a builder, administrator, spiritual guide advisor, and Major Superior from 1942–1960".

== Early life and career ==
Catherine Wilhelmina Wirfs was born of German heritage on June 1, 1886, in Chicago, Illinois. Her parents were Anthony Wirfs, born in Detroit, Michigan, and Ursula Grassel from Bavaria. She was baptized on June 27, 1886. Catherine Wirfs attended St. Nicholas School where she met the School Sisters of St. Francis, who had recently arrived from Germany. At the age of 18, in 1904, she joined the order and was given the name Sister Mary Corona. She was sent to teach at St. Matthias Parish School in Chicago without formal teacher education. After one year, she was transferred to St. Philomena Parish School to become the principal of a school with 90 students. In 1911 she added a Commercial High School class to the curriculum, which was taught by Sister Clemens Rudolph, who had been trained to teach business courses. By 1923, the school had 16 rooms of grade school pupils and 27 Sisters on the faculty.

In 1925, Mother Stanislaus, then Superior General of the School Sisters of St. Francis, called Wirfs to work in the motherhouse as Mother Assistant. When Mother Stanislaus resigned in 1942, Wirfs was elected Superior General of the Order, which included houses in Germany, Costa Rica, El Salvador, Honduras, India, and China.

== Career ==
Wirfs was president of Alverno College in Milwaukee, Wisconsin (founded at the School Sisters' motherhouse in 1936 as Alverno Teachers College in 1936 for the purpose of educating teachers for the School Sisters of St. Francis' schools and missions) from 1942 to 1948. As president, responding to pressure from the government requiring teachers to be state-certified, Wirfs opened the college to lay women in 1948. During World War II, the demand for teacher preparation had relaxed due to a shortage of teachers in the U.S., but Wirfs began to buy property to accommodate the requirement for better-trained and certified teachers by the end of the war. The move to train and certify teachers and allow lay people to attend Alverno was also motivated by the reluctance, as expressed by the Vatican, to encourage Catholic educators, both lay and religious, to attend secular institutions.

Construction at the new site, named Corona Hall, began in 1950 and was dedicated on May 1, 1954. Funding for the college and for its teacher education programs was a struggle in the following years. Wirfs appealed to business leaders and the sisters' home parishes, who benefitted from the education their parish schools had received from Alverno. As Barbaralie Stiefermann, Wirfs' biographer, stated, "At the time of the dedication, newspaper accounts hailed Alverno's present-day campus as a six-million-dollar wonder".

Wirfs was instrumental in the construction of St. Joseph High School in Kenosha, Wisconsin, a Catholic high school built in 1947–1950. From the beginning, there were questions as to how the project would be financed. Originally, the cost was estimated at $1 million, but by 1955 the cost had risen to $3 million. It was supposed to be financed by the six parishes the school would serve. However, a fund drive in 1957 raised only $40,000 of the $500,000 initial goal, so Wirfs and the School Sisters were left with paying the debt.

At the dedication of the school in 1958, Archbishop Meyer paid tribute to Wirfs. According to Stiefermann, "He singled out the School Sisters of St. Francis and Mother Corona, mother general of the order, for their contributions both in money and personnel to staff the school. Literally, without Mother Corona's help and the School Sisters of St. Francis, the school would never have become a reality". At the same time, however, congregational leaders worried about bankruptcy caused by the financial obligations incurred by the school. The cost of the school had risen to $5 million, so in 1991, after years of struggle, St. Joseph High School was turned over to the Archdiocese of Milwaukee. Stiefermann reported that St. Joseph's former students praised the education they had received at St. Joseph's. In 2010, St. Joseph High School was combined with St. Mark the Evangelist Elementary School and St. Joseph Interparish Junior High School to form the St. Joseph Catholic Academy.

In 1943, a committee of citizens in Waupun, Wisconsin, began to plan for a 50-bed hospital. The committee had collected $26,500 and land had been donated by several citizens and by the city. Requests for federal aid were denied because there were other hospitals in the area. The committee knew that Mother Stanislaus, Wirfs' predecessor, had been responsible for building St. Joseph Hospital, in a neighboring city, Beaver Dam, in 1938, which motivated them to contact Wirfs. In 1949, she agreed to have her congregation build a 100-bed hospital in Waupun. The hospital became known as the Franciscan Sisters Hospital. Wirfs requested a $4 million loan for the project, but because the School Sisters of St. Francis was created by papal order, Wirfs had to appeal to Rome for approval. The hospital opened its doors on July 11, 1951; since 1981, the Congregation of Sisters of St. Agnes, based in Fond du Lac, Wisconsin, has owned the hospital.

In 1955, the archbishop of the Milwaukee Archdiocese asked Wirfs to remodel and expand St. Joseph Hospital in Beaver Dam from 65 beds to 125 beds. The new building opened in 1960. Later, there was discussion about merging St. Joseph with another hospital run by the Lutheran Church, which would avoid duplication of services and equipment, enhance the quality of care, and attract highly qualified physicians and other personnel. Eventually, after two years of discussions and deadlocks, the two hospitals merged in 1972 and became known as Beaver Dam Community Hospitals, Inc.

Meanwhile, another request came on May 30, 1946 from Cardinal Archbishop Samuel Stritch, Archbishop of Chicago. The Bishop explained that Sisters of Mercy had been teaching in Holy Angels Parish in Chicago, but were no longer able to staff it. "I have opened the parish to the colored," he said, "and we are doing very well. Our problem is that we want to take a very large number of colored children into the school. We have the facilities, and in time we can have also a High School." A following letter arrived from the Archbishop on June 6, 1946. "I wish you could have seen my face when I opened your letter . . . When I read that you are going to do this mission work for me, I am sure that my face radiated joy and appreciation." The following year, in September 1947, a letter from Reverend J.J. Duffin, pastor of Holy Angels Parish to the Cardinal Archbishop reported that Mother Corona had sent two more sisters, and had transferred one sister from Sacred Heart Sanitarium and another who had been a clerk at Madonna High school "to take care of an enrolment of 750 children."

Possibly because of her reputation as a builder and her ability to find ways to establish schools and hospitals, the archbishop of Omaha, Nebraska wrote to Wirfs, asking her to build and staff a new Catholic High School, Ryan High School in Omaha. A correspondence began in 1950 with Archbishop Bergan writing, "There is a crying need for a coeducational Catholic high school in South Omaha". Four years later, in 1954 the archbishop again wrote, asking Wirfs to build a new high school in South Omaha. He would donate the site and give her "a minimum of half a million dollars". At first, she agreed to staff the school but refused any acceptance of the debt. She wrote to Bishop Bergan: "We sincerely regret that we cannot continue with the building at the present time, but in all sincerity, we must say that we are not financially able to do so". After some negotiations, and with an agreement for a smaller school, Wirfs agreed, and the school opened on September 2, 1958. For 25 years the school flourished, but as with St. Joseph High School in Kenosha, declining enrolment forced the school to close, and the building was turned over to the Diocese of Omaha. Later, in 1983, Ryan High School merged with Paul VI High School and was renamed St. Joseph High School. Paul VI closed in 1983. St. Joseph High School continued until 1989.

In the late 1950s and early 60s, Wirfs needed space in Milwaukee to house the many new applicants who wanted to join the School Sisters. By this time, she was an experienced builder and fundraiser. The building was named Marian Hall, groundbreaking took place on September 8, 1954, and the first Mass was celebrated there in 1956. Ten years later, in 1966, the building closed because the number of women applicants had dropped. It opened again in 1969 for retired sisters but closed again in 2002, was sold to the Jesuits for a middle school for Hispanic boys. It was renamed Nativity Jesuit Academy.

== Death ==
Wirfs died on Saturday, January 6, 1964, at the age of 77. On Thursday, January 11, her funeral Mass was celebrated in the convent chapel by William Edward Cousins, Archbishop of Milwaukee, assisted by Monsignor Alex Zuern and Reverends Raymond Parr and Hugh Wish. She was buried in Mount Olivet Cemetery, 3801 Morgan Avenue, Milwaukee Wisconsin.

== Works cited ==
- Stiefermann, Barbaralie A. (2018). Mother M. Corona: Her Life and Legacy. Mukwonago, Wisconsin: Nico 11 Publishing & Design. ISBN 978-1945907395.
