= Cree Myles =

American social activist

Cree Myles is an American influencer, writer and organizer, living in Milwaukee. She is the creator and manager of 'All Ways Black' on Instagram.

== Early life ==
Born in Milwaukee, Myles's parents moved their family to Menomonee Falls when she was ten. There her mother was the first black female principal and her father was Wisconsin’s first black game warden. Myles's grandmother was one of 16 children in rural Mississippi, and was a direct descendant of enslaved people. Myles received a dual bachelor's degree at Alverno College in Community Development and Global Studies.

== Music ==
Myles's father is a blues guitarist, and inspired an early love of music. After college Myles performed as a singer in and around the Riverwest area, getting her start performing at homeless shelters. She also performed at local breweries and jazz clubs.

== Book Advocacy ==
Myles partnered with Penguin Random House to organize a read-a-thon called 'Black Like We Never Left' featuring works by Toni Morrison. Penguin Random House offered Myles a job curating an Instagram platform centered on Black books. The platform was named All Ways Black, based on a suggestion from her husband. It includes chats with Black authors, interactive read-a-thons, and awards galas for Black Bookstagrammers. Penguin Random House reports that the platform has the highest average engagement rate of all their content groups. Myles's video 'Introducing All Ways Black' won for Medium-Length Video at the 14th annual Shorty Awards.
