= School Sisters of St. Francis =

Coordinates: 48.6390°N 8.1136°E

Interior of St. Joseph Chapel, Milwaukee

The School Sisters of St. Francis (abbreviated SSSF) are an international religious congregation of Catholic sisters, part of the Third Order of Saint Francis, founded in 1874 in New Cassel, Wisconsin. The congregation’s mission covers the United States, Europe, Latin America and India.

== History ==
On April 28, 1874, Emma Franziska Höll (Sister Mary Alexia) and two other religious sisters arrived in New Cassel, Wisconsin from Schwarzach, in the German Empire, to establish a new religious congregation. They built a boarding school in New Cassel, and would in subsequent years built other facilities in Wisconsin, including a mission for Chippewa Indians in Reserve, Wisconsin and what would eventually become the SSSF motherhouse in Milwaukee. Many women joined the community, and by 1887 sisters staffed schools in five states.

In 1887 St. Joseph's Normal School was established within the motherhouse to train the sisters. It became Alverno Teachers College in 1936 and Alverno College in 1946.

In light of its German heritage, the SSSF were very effective in ministering to the German immigrant population in the region. Members of the congregation from a Polish background decided to establish a separate congregation to address the educational needs of children of Polish immigrants. Forty-six sisters left to form the Sisters of St. Joseph of the Third Order of St. Francis.

== St. Joseph Center Chapel ==
The St. Joseph Center Chapel was consecrated on the Feast of St. Joseph, March 19, 1917. Milwaukee architects, Peter Brust and Richard Philipp, designed the Chapel in the style of Italian Romanesque Revival, having toured Italy as research for this commission. There are three altars in the main body of the chapel, each constructed of Carrara marble shipped from Italy during World War I. Given the danger of attack by German U-boats, the shipment required the special authorization of President Woodrow Wilson. Murals depicting the seven sacraments adorn the walls of the sacristy to the right of the sanctuary. These murals are noteworthy both because a resident sister painted them, and because she included portraits of local Milwaukeeans in her painting.

== Present day ==
The School Sisters of St. Francis serve in twenty-one states in the USA, and in ten countries.

=== United States ===
In America, the sisters opened Alvernia High School, (Chicago), and Madonna High School, (Aurora, Illinois). The Province also supports the Marian Hall Home, a personal care community in Bellevue, Pennsylvania. In 1929, the sisters opened Pius XI High School in Milwaukee, in collaboration with the Pallottines.

=== Europe ===
Mother Alexia returned to Europe in 1895, where she focused the community’s energies on ministry in sanitariums, kindergartens, homes for orphans and troubled youth, and homes for young women seeking higher education. In 1895 the first mission opened in Erlenbad, Germany, and in 1907 the European Province was officially established. Over 140 School Sisters of St. Francis serve the pastoral, educational, health, and social needs of rural and urban communities in Switzerland and Germany.

=== India ===
In 1936, sisters from the European province began missionary work in India, and young women from India began to travel to the convent in Germany. The congregation has two provinces in India, staffed by 175 sisters.

=== Latin America ===
Service to the people of Latin America began in 1932 when sisters from the European Province went to Honduras at the request of the local Church. Sixty School Sisters of St. Francis from Latin America serve the pastoral, educational, health and social needs of the poor and marginalized in Costa Rica, Guatemala, Honduras, Mexico, Nicaragua and Peru.

== Notable members ==
- M. Rebecca Brenner, educator and sociologist in Chicago, Il
- M. Mary Corona, Major Superior from 1942-1960
- Diane Drufenbrock, professor of mathematics and vice-presidential candidate for the Socialist Party USA in the 1980 United States presidential election
- María Rosa Leggol, Honduran sister who has been called the "Mother Teresa" of Honduras
- Joel Read, president of Alverno College from 1968-2003 and founding member of the National Organization for Women
- Marion Verhaalen, composer and musicologist
- Winifred O. Whelan, academic, writer, and Wikipedian
