= Arleigh McCree =

Arleigh E. McCree
- Born: December 24, 1939; Los Angeles, California, U.S.
- Died: February 8, 1986 (aged 46); Hollywood, California, U.S.
- Spouse(s): Edith McCree, Maureen Anderson
- Children: 2
- Police career
- Country: United States of America
- Allegiance: Los Angeles
- Department: Los Angeles Police Department
- Service years: February 1965 – February 1986
- Rank: Sworn in as an Officer (February 1965); Detective III
- Badge no.: 12241
- Awards: LAPD Medal for Heroism

Detective III Arleigh Eugene McCree (December 24, 1939 – February 8, 1986) was the Commander of the Firearms and Explosives Unit of the Los Angeles Police Department and counter-terrorism specialist, widely recognized as one of the top explosive experts in the world.

== LAPD career ==
By the 1970s, McCree had employed his Navy Underwater Demolition Team training to create, with a few other ex-military officers, the LAPD's first SWAT (Special Weapons and Tactics) Team, trained to conduct forced entry to "hardened" targets, hostage rescue, bomb disposal and other skills beyond the purview of ordinary street policing. SWAT Team members carried fully-automatic AR-15 rifles and other paramilitary gear in their police vehicles at all times in case they were called to a scene on short notice; however, they were not allowed to use the AR-15 in non-SWAT situations.

Around this time, McCree was responsible for the shooting deaths of four suspected Black Panther Party members who had allegedly fired on an LAPD officer from a parked vehicle. Though McCree had used his AR-15 in a non-SWAT situation, his use of deadly force was vindicated by the review board and he was thereafter commended by the LAPD.

McCree investigated the Symbionese Liberation Army bomb making operations in 1976 and was part of the bomb squad that investigated the Marine barracks bombing in Beirut, Lebanon in 1983. A year later, McCree headed the 1984 Los Angeles Olympics bomb squad. McCree had written a text on explosive devices. In 1982 he testified before the Senate Judiciary Subcommittee on Security and Terrorism. He said government manuals on how to make bombs were too easy for terrorists to get.

== Personal ==
McCree was also a contributor to Military Police magazine.

== Death ==
McCree was killed along with officer Ronald Ball in a 1986 bomb disposal operation in North Hollywood, California. Both officers were attempting to defuse two pipe bombs in a murder suspect's garage when they both detonated. McCree died instantly, and Ball would die about an hour later.

He is honored among the fallen officers in the line of duty at the National Law Enforcement Officers Memorial in Washington, D.C.
