= Alverno College =

Catholic women's college in Milwaukee, Wisconsin, US

- Alverno College Seal
- Former names: St. Joseph's Normal School (1887–1936); Alverno Teachers College (1936–1946)
- Motto: In Sanctitate et Doctrina
- Motto in English: In Holiness and Learning
- Type: Private women's college
- Established: 1887; 139 years ago
- Religious affiliation: Roman Catholic (School Sisters of St. Francis)
- Endowment: $41.6 million
- President: Christy L. Brown
- Academic staff: 79
- Administrative staff: 130
- Students: 1,322
- Undergraduates: 673
- Postgraduates: 649
- Location: Milwaukee, Wisconsin, United States; 42°58′59″N 87°57′54″W
- Campus: 47 acres (19 ha)
- Colors
- Nickname: Inferno
- Mascot: Blaze the Inferno
- Website: alverno.edu

Alverno College is a private Catholic women's college in Milwaukee, Wisconsin, United States.

== History ==
Chartered in 1887 as St. Joseph's Normal School, Alverno became Alverno Teachers College in 1936. It adopted its current name in 1946.

Milwaukee native Christy L. Brown was selected as the college's ninth president on April 19, 2023. The following year, the college had a $12.4 million operating deficit. Its board of trustees subsequently declared "financial exigency" and announced plans to eliminate full-time faculty and staff, cut academic programs, end its track and field program, and engage in other activities to address the deficit.

== Academics ==
Alverno offers undergraduate programs and a coeducational Master of Arts program for teachers and business professionals, the Alverno MBA, and a Master of Science in nursing. The Weekend College was opened in 1977 as the first alternative time-frame program in Milwaukee to serve working women in the Milwaukee area. It is still primarily a women's college. The baccalaureate degree programs, residences, etc. are still open only to women; graduate degree programs are open to both women and men.

Alverno does not use a letter or number system for grading but instead uses an abilities-based curriculum and narrative evaluation.

The college was tied for 62 out of 127 in "Regional Universities Midwest" in the 2022–23 U.S. News & World Report Best Colleges Ranking.

== Athletics ==
Alverno College teams participate as a member of the National Collegiate Athletic Association's Division III. The Inferno are a member of the Northern Athletics Conference (NAC). Alverno was also a member of the Lake Michigan Conference until the spring of 2006. Women's sports include basketball, cross country, soccer, softball, tennis and volleyball. Boxing was added as a club sport in 2016, and the team competes as part of the United States Intercollegiate Boxing Association; they have earned one individual championship as of 2019.

== Notable people ==
=== Alumni ===
- Diane Drufenbrock, Roman Catholic nun and Socialist Party nominee for Vice President of the United States
- Georgine Loacker, educator
- Cree Myles, influencer, writer and organizer
- Toni Palermo, educator and baseball player
- Celeste Raspanti, educator, playwright
- Joel Read, Roman Catholic nun and educator
- Marilyn Shrude, composer
- Marion Verhaalen, composer and musicologist

=== Faculty ===
- Carole Barrowman, English professor and author
- M. Mary Corona, college president from 1942 to 1948
