= Cree LeFavour =

American writer (born 1965)

Cree LeFavour (born 1965) is an American writer and former academic. She is the author of seven books and the co-author of two more. Her books include the novel Private Means, the memoir Lights On, Rats Out, and the James Beard Award finalist Fish.

== Life and education ==
LeFavour was born in Aspen, Colorado, where her father, the chef Bruce LeFavour, owned the Paragon Restaurant. In 1974 LeFavour and her family moved to Robinson Bar Ranch, a dude ranch in central Idaho that the family later sold to Carole King. LeFavour and her sister Nicole attended Stanley Elementary School before moving to Sun Valley where they attended and graduated from the Community School. Cree went on to graduate from Middlebury College in Vermont with a B.A. degree in American History. LeFavour completed her Ph.D. in American Studies at New York University in 2004.

LeFavour has two children with her husband, the book critic Dwight Garner. She lives in New York City.

== Critical reception ==
In "An Odyssey of Self-Harm and Out the Other Side", Daphne Merkin's New York Times review of Lights On, Rats Out, she praised LeFavour's "rare willingness to take the reader into difficult and sometimes unpleasant territory." Merkin called the book "courageous and unsettling" and "a riveting account of a 'particular kind of crazy'." The book was included in Book Riot's "50 Must-Read Memoirs of Mental Illness"

Library Journal described LeFavour's novel Private Means as a "wry, sophisticated, and intelligent rendering of modern, privileged city life", while Chloe Schama in Vogue called it "a tart comedy of manners. Lionel Shriver, writing for The New York Times, was less impressed, asking in her tepid review titled "One Cheats the Other Wants To": "Is it not sufficient to pass a reader’s time agreeably enough, and to tell a proficiently executed story with an age-old theme and an updated setting? I don’t know. You tell me."

== Published works ==
- Private Means, Grove Press, 2020 ISBN 978-0802148889
- Lights On, Rats Out, Grove Atlantic, 2017. ISBN 0802125964
- Pork: More Than 50 Heavenly Meals that Celebrate the Glory of Pig, Delicious Pig. Chronicle Books, 2014 ISBN 978-1452109831
- Fish: 54 Seafood Feasts, Chronicle Books, 2013. ISBN 978-1452109480
- Poulet: More than 50 Remarkable Recipes that Exalt the Honest Chicken. Chronicle Books, 2011 ISBN 978-0811879699
- The New Steak: Recipes for a Range of Cuts Plus Sides, Ten Speed Press, 2008 ISBN 978-1580088909
- Who Reads and American Book: British Reprints and Popular Reading in America, 1848-1858. VDM Verlag 2009 ISBN 978-3639175790

== Co-authored works ==
- Cindy Brooks and Cree LeFavour, The Ucross Cookbook, 2022.
- Michael Phillips and Cree LeFavour, Chelsea Market Makers, Stewart, Chabori & Tang. ISBN 978-1617691669

== Selected criticism ==
- "Edan Lepucki's Third Novel Makes 'The Cult of Motherhood Literal,'" The New York Times, August 3, 2023.
- "Claire Vaye Watkins Urgent, Sweaty Novel About a Woman Who's a Mess", The New York Times, October 5, 2021.
- "Jane Eyre Fever: Deciphering the Astonishing Popular Success of Charlotte Bronte in Antebellum America," Book History, 2004.
- "Acting 'Natural': Vanity Fair and the Unmasking of American Sentimentality", in, Lance Newman, Joel Pace, Chris Koenig-Woodyard, eds, Sullen Fires Across the Atlantic: Essays in Transatlantic, Romanticism, Romantic Circles, November 2006.
