= Loacker =

Italian confectionery company

Loacker S.p.A. Loacker AG
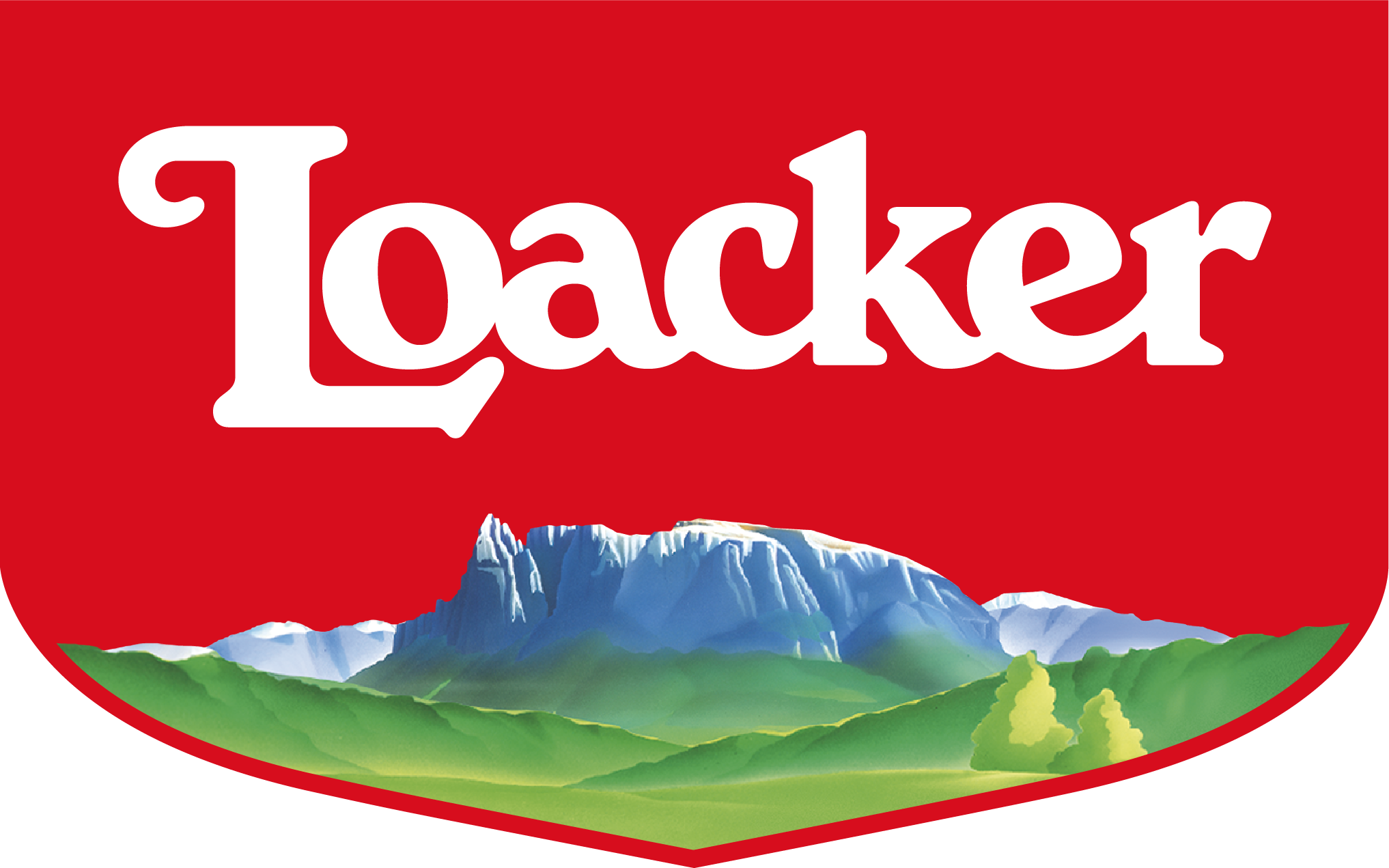
- Type: Società per azioni
- Industry: Food
- Founded: April 3, 1925 (101 years ago) in Bolzano, South Tyrol, Italy
- Founder: Alfons Loacker
- Headquarters: Auna di Sotto/Unterinn, South Tyrol, Italy
- Key people: Andreas Loacker; Christine Loacker Zuenelli; Martin Loacker; Ulrich Zuenelli (president)
- Products: Wafers; Chocolates
- Revenue: €480 million (2025)
- Number of employees: 1,153 (January 2024)
- Website: www.loacker.com

Loacker (Austrian German: [ˈloːakɐ], Italian: [loˈaːker]) is an Italian confectionery company based in South Tyrol, specialized in the production of wafers, chocolate and derivative products.

== History ==
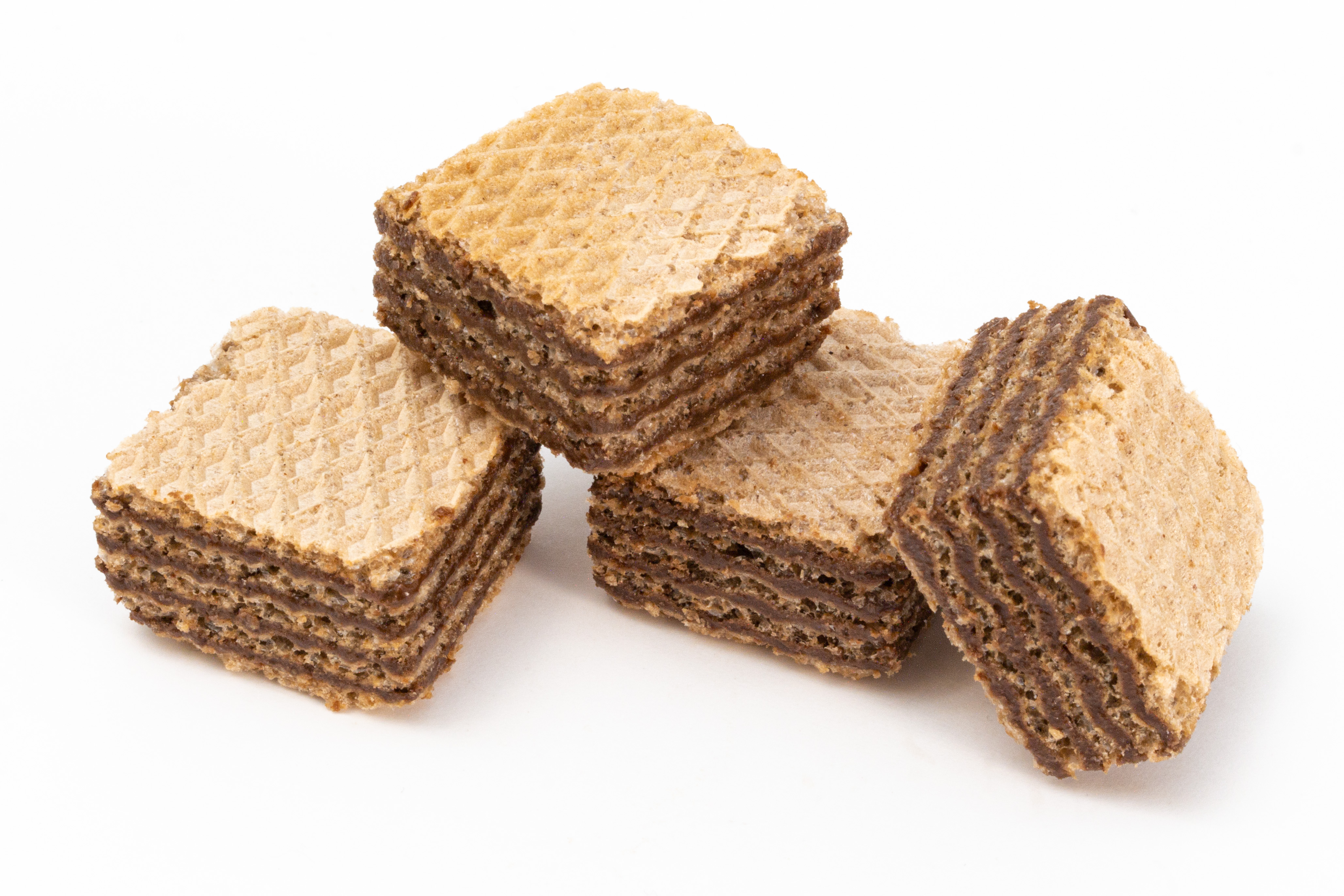
Loacker's Quadratini wafer biscuits

The company was founded in 1925 in the historic city center of Bolzano by the Austrian confectioner Alfons Loacker. Back then, he opened a small store with two assistants in Piazza Domenicani.

In 1974, Loacker moved away from the city, marking the transition from a small regional bakery to an industrial reality. Armin Loacker, Alfons' son, chose the Renon plateau in the heart of the Dolomites to produce his own wafers.

== Manufacturing ==
Loacker nowadays has two plants, one in Auna di Sotto on the Renon and a second one in Heinfels in East Tyrol (Austria). At both production sites wafers and chocolate specialties are produced at more than 1,000 meters above sea level. Today, the third generation leads the company: Armin's sons Andreas and Martin Loacker together with his nephew Ulrich Zuenelli who works as executive chairman.

As of 2021, Loacker has 1,153 employees. In 2025, 1.05 billion single pieces were produced and 37,510 tons of products were sold which amounted to net sales of €480 million. Italy, the United States, and Saudi Arabia were the highest-consuming countries, followed by Israel and China.

In 2022, Loacker announced the initiation of a multi-year partnership with Sammontana for the production of a new range of Loacker-branded ice creams.

== Products and ingredients ==
The Napolitaner (Hazelnut) flavored ranges are amongst Loacker's best-known products. The name "Napolitaner" derives from the hazelnuts which represent the main ingredient of the cream in the wafers and used to be sourced from plantations near Naples.

Nowadays, Loacker has initiated four sustainability pathways for both production and sourcing of raw materials, aiming to increase verticalization of its own supply chain.

In addition to the vanilla Bourbon pods from Madagascar and the cocoa beans cultivated in Ecuador and the Ivory Coast, Loacker uses milk powder from Dolomites Milk in Vandoies for its dairy creams. Dolomites Milk is a joint venture between Loacker and the South Tyrolean dairy cooperative BRIMI which comprises 1,100 local farmers. This 10,000 m^{2} facility is the first plant which is specialized in whey and milk powder in Italy.

Loacker covers part of its hazelnut supply needs through products coming from two company-owned farms located in Tuscany and orchards of 90 more farms which are part of a cultivation project with based on supply chain contracts in Veneto, Umbria, Tuscany and Marche.

Furthermore, Loacker distributes products branded by Lorenz, Pema, Twinings, Ovomaltine and Darbo in Italy.

== Loacker Café ==
Besides the production and sale of its own products to both small and large distributors, the group also comprises five Loacker Cafés, all of which are located in Tyrol.

These Cafés represent a mix between a store, where the entire Loacker product assortment is sold, and a confectionery, where people can enjoy freshly baked goods and high-quality coffee. The Cafés are located at historically and strategically important sites to the company, including Bolzano's Piazza Walther in its historic city center, the Twenty shopping mall, the Outlet Center Brennero, Piazza Fiera in Trento and Heinfels, right next to Loacker's production site in Eastern Tyrol.
