= Schloss Gleichenberg =

Castle in Austria

Coordinates: 46°53′38″N 15°53′32″E

- Styria, Austria
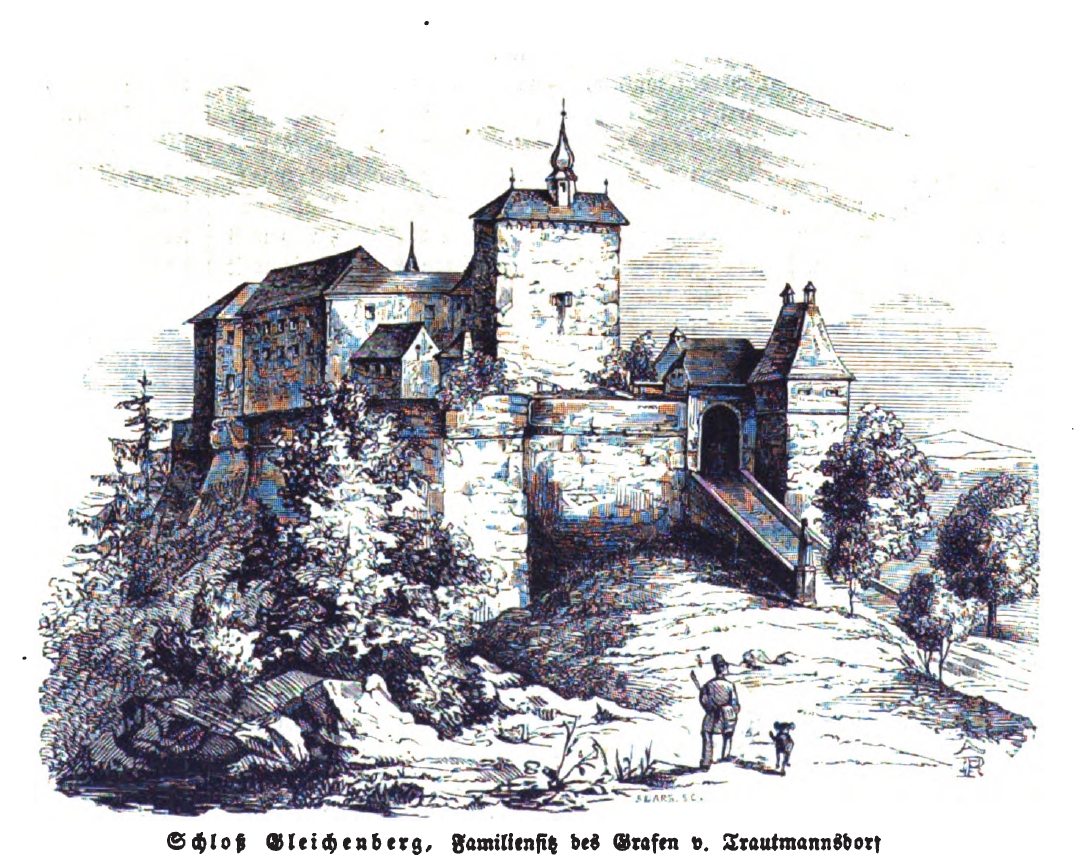

Site information
- Type: Castle

Site history
- Built: 1312
- Built by: Lords of Walsee

Schloss Gleichenberg is a castle in Styria, Austria. Schloss Gleichenberg is situated at a height of 414 meters (1,358 ft).

== See also ==
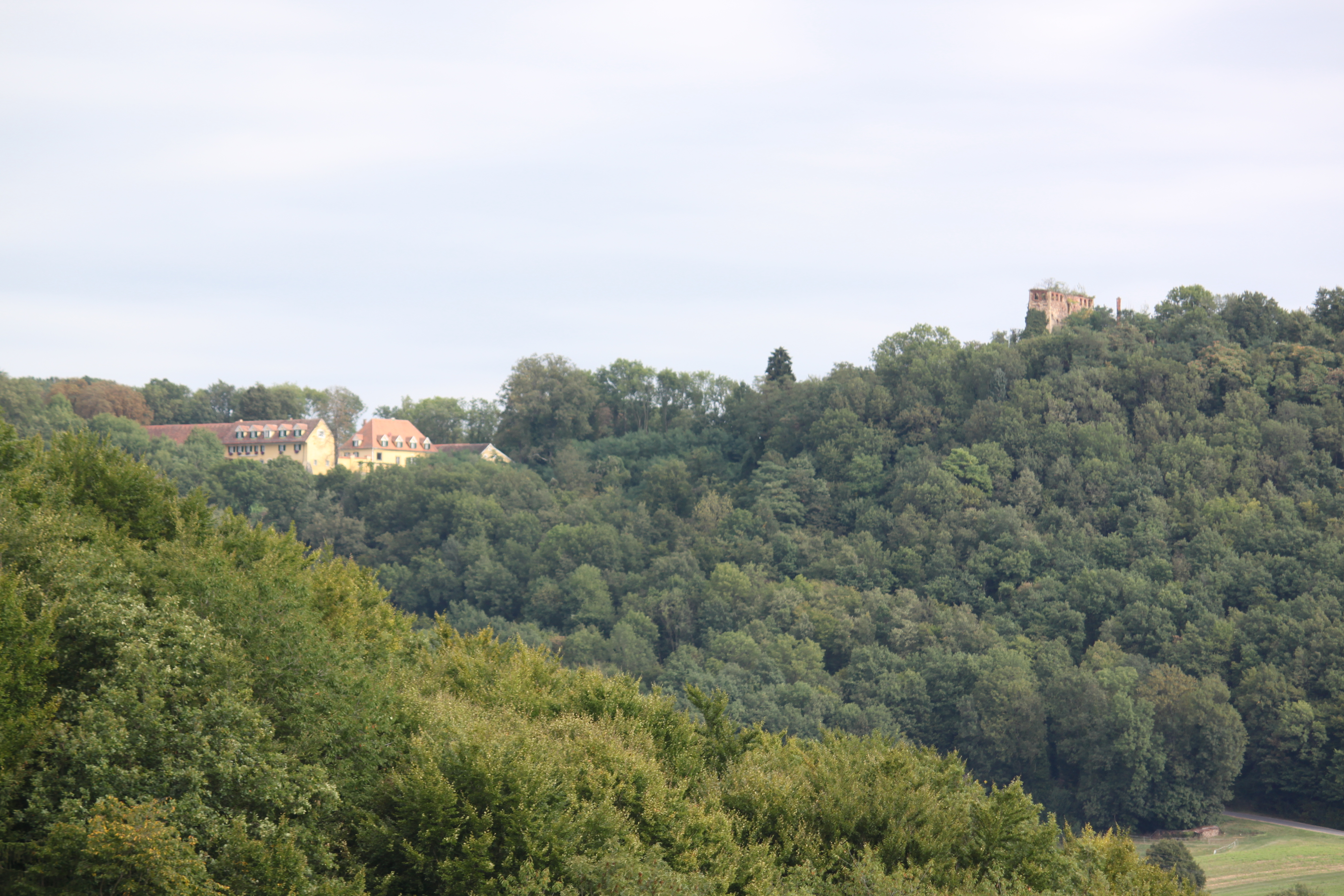
- Ruins of Gleichenberg on the right
  List of castles in Austria

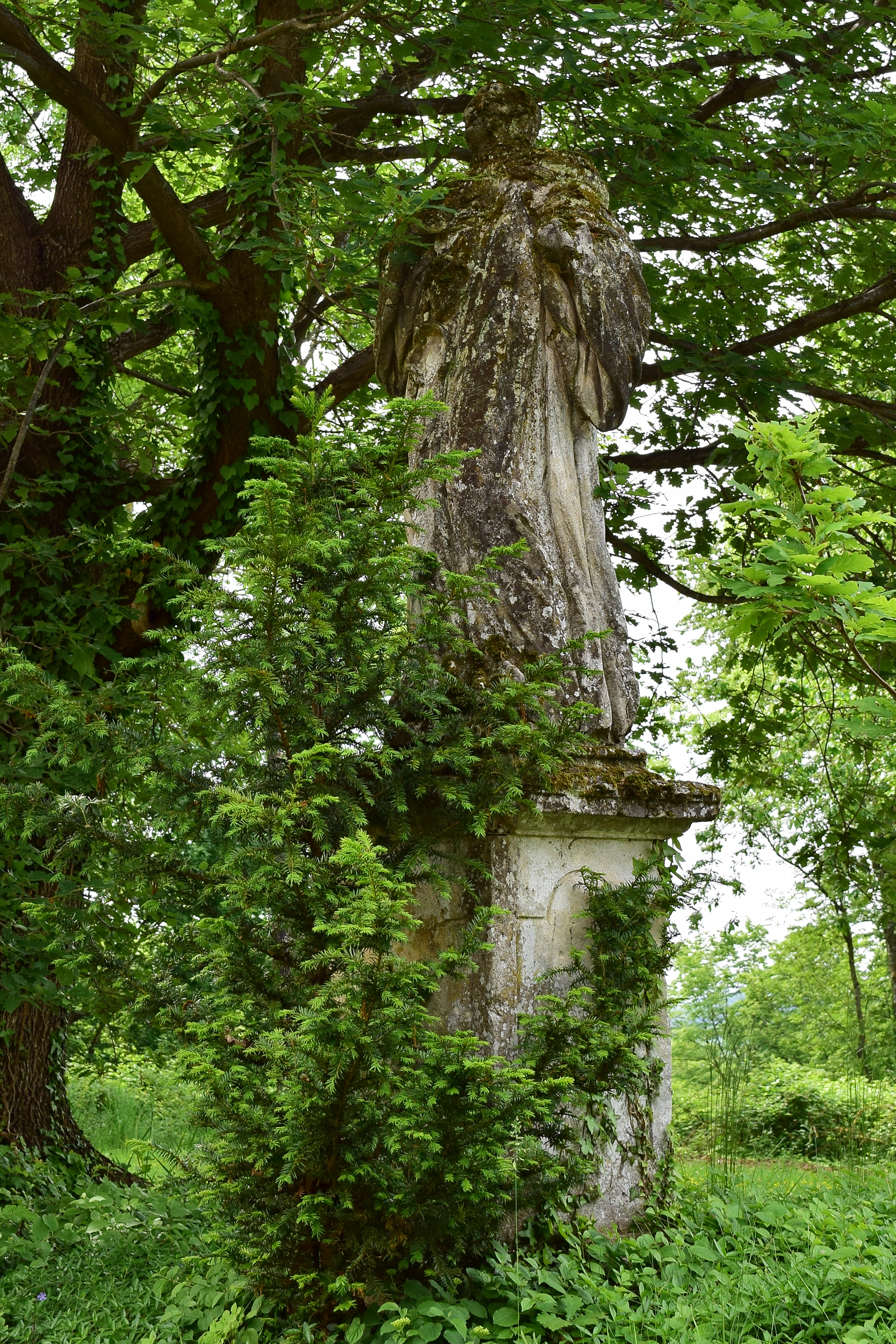
St. Leonhard at the castle
