= Julius Agrippa =

2nd century nobleman from the royal family of Emesa

Julius Agrippa was a Syrian nobleman from the Royal family of Emesa who lived in the 2nd century.

Agrippa was an Emesene nobleman who was a direct descendant of the Emesene Roman Priest-Client King Sohaemus of Emesa, also known as Gaius Julius Sohaemus. He was the brother of a Julius and the paternal uncle of Julius Bassianus, the Emesene High Priest of El-Gebal. El-Gebal is the Aramaic name for the Syrian Sun God.

Agrippa served as a Primipilaris, a former leading Centurion. Agrippa was a man of some wealth as he owned an estate. When Agrippa died perhaps sometime before the late 180s, his name appears to be registered at the time of the Roman Jurist Quintus Cervidius Scaevola.

Agrippa's estate was left to the Roman Empress Julia Domna, as he was the paternal great-uncle to Domna and her elder sister Julia Maesa. Agrippa is not to be confused with the powerful Lucius Julius Gainius Fabius Agrippa of Apamea.

== See also ==
- Imperial Roman army

== Sources ==
- A.R. Birley, Septimius Severus: The African Emperor, Routledge, 2002
- B. Levick, Julia Domna: Syrian Empress, Routledge, 2007
