= Severan dynasty =

Roman imperial dynasty (ruled 193 to 235)

The Severan dynasty, sometimes called the Septimian dynasty, ruled the Roman Empire between 193 and 235. It was founded by the emperor Septimius Severus (r. 193–211) and Julia Domna, his wife, when Septimius emerged victorious from civil war of 193–197, which began with the Year of the Five Emperors. Their two sons, Caracalla (r. 192–217) and Geta (r. 211), ruled briefly after the death of Septimius.

In 217–218 there was a short interruption of dynasty's control over the empire by reigns of Macrinus (r. 217–218) and his son Diadumenian (r. 218) before Julia Domna's relatives assumed power by raising her two grandnephews, Elagabalus (r. 218–222) and Severus Alexander (r. 222–235), in succession to the imperial office.

The dynasty's women, Julia Domna, the mother of Caracalla and Geta, and her sister, Julia Maesa, the mother of Julia Soaemias and Julia Mamaea, mothers of Elagabalus and Severus Alexander respectively, were all powerful augustae. They were also instrumental in securing imperial positions for their male relatives.

Although Septimius Severus restored peace following the upheaval of the late 2nd century, the dynasty's rule was disturbed by unstable family relationships and political instability, especially the rising power of the praetorian prefects. All this foreshadowed the Crisis of the Third Century.

== History ==
- Red denotes Senior Emperors
- Pink denotes Junior Emperors
- Blue denotes Caesars (official heirs)

=== Septimius Severus (193–211) ===
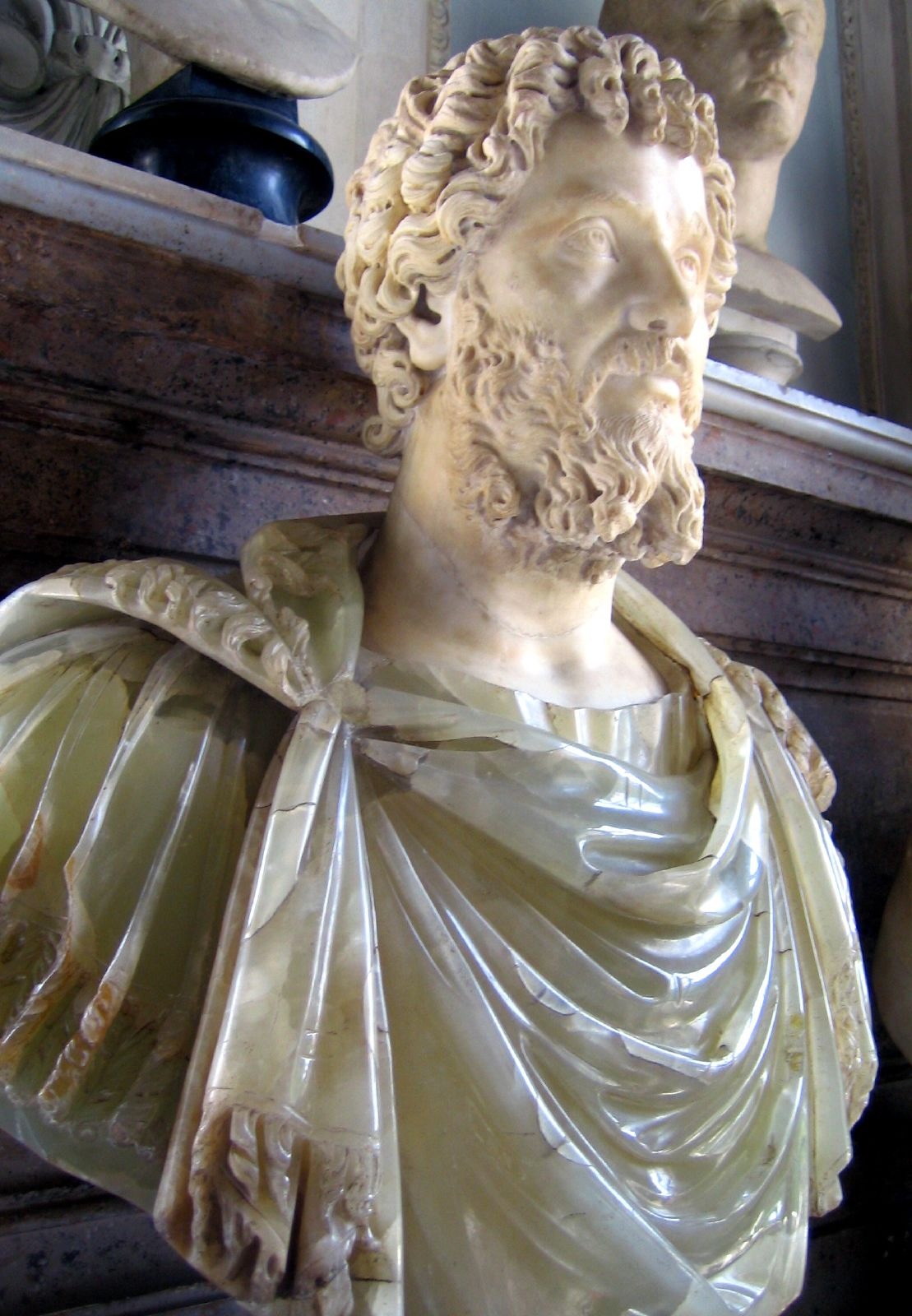
The Libyan emperor Septimius Severus, the founder of the Severan dynasty

In April 9, 145, Lucius Septimius Severus was born in Leptis Magna, then in the Roman province of Africa Proconsularis and now in Libya, into a Roman family of equestrian rank, of Libyan-Punic and Italic origin. He rose through military service to consular rank under the later emperors of the Antonine dynasty. In summer 187 he married a Syrian Arab noblewoman Julia Domna. The marriage produced two boys: Caracalla and Geta. Julia Domna also held a prominent political role in government during her husband's reign.

Severus was proclaimed emperor in 193 by his legionaries in Noricum during the political unrest that followed the death of Commodus., He secured sole rule over the empire in early 197, after defeating Clodius Albinus at the Battle of Lugdunum.

In late 197 Severus fought a successful war against the Parthians, between 208 and 210 he campaigned with success against barbarian incursions in Roman Britain and rebuilt Hadrian's Wall. In Rome, his relations with the Senate were poor, but he was popular with the commoners and with his soldiers, whose salary he raised. Starting in 197, his praetorian prefect, Gaius Fulvius Plautianus, was growing in influence, but he would be executed in 205. Septimius died, from natural causes, in early 211 while on campaign in Britain.

During his reign, Severus debased the Roman currency several times -- for example upon his accession he decreased the silver purity of the denarius from 81.5% to 78.5%. The Jews experienced more favorable conditions under the Severan dynasty: According to Jerome, both Septimius Severus and Antoninus "very greatly cherished the Jews."

Septimius was succeeded by his sons Caracalla and Geta, whom he had elevated as co-emperors in the years preceding his death. The growing hostility between the brothers was initially buffered by Julia Domna's mediation.

=== Caracalla (198–217) ===
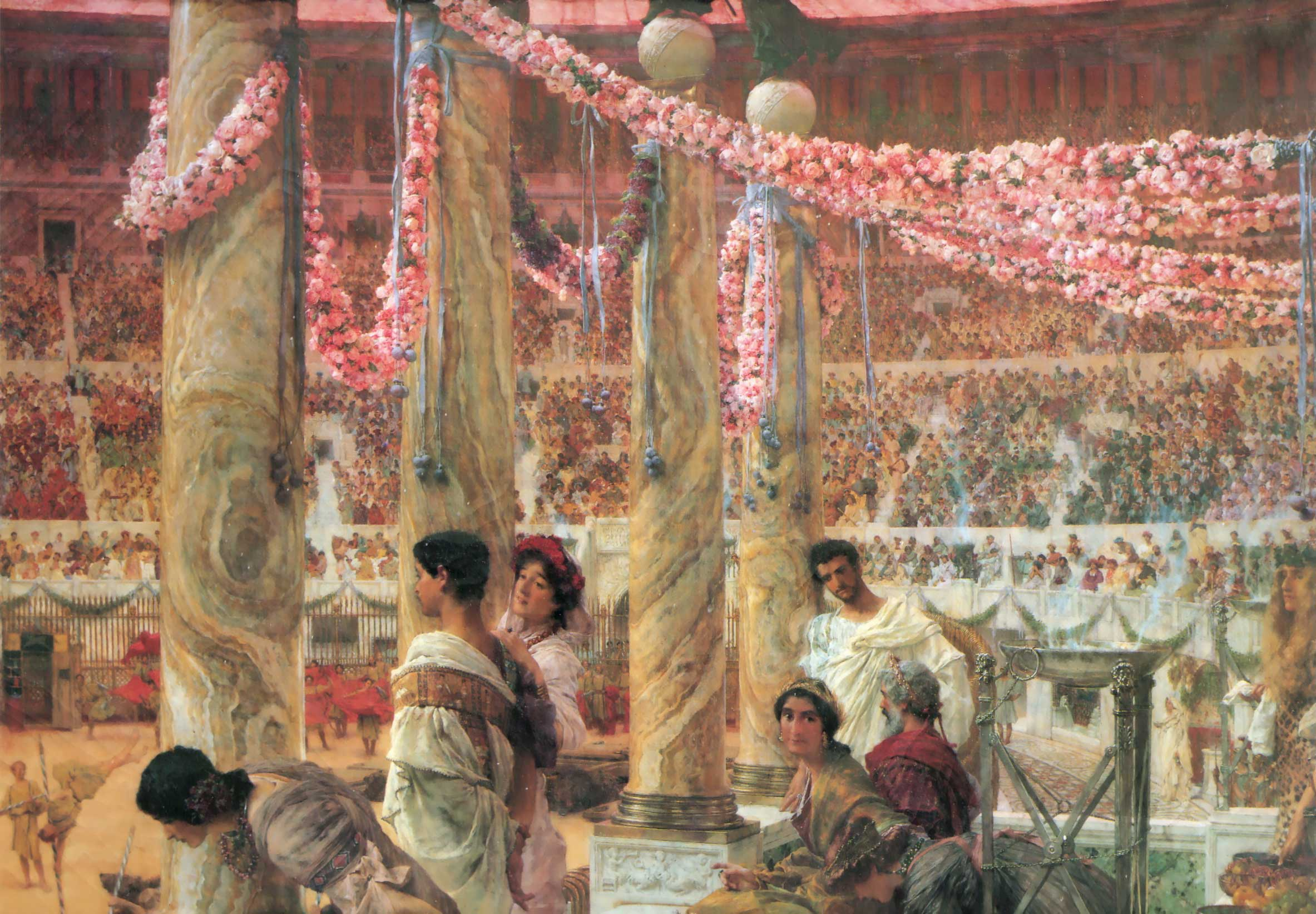
Caracalla and Geta, Lawrence Alma-Tadema (1907)

The eldest son of Severus, born in 188 as Lucius Septimius Bassianus. "Caracalla" was a nickname referring to the Gallic hooded tunic that he habitually wore. In 195 Severus made him caesar and renamed him to Aurelius Antonius Marcus after Marcus Aurelius. A while later, in 198, Severus made him augustus while also naming Caracalla's younger brother, Geta, to caesar.

Caracalla hated his brother, and conflict between them culminated in the assassination of the latter in 211. After the murder of his brother, Caracalla tried and gained goodwill of his legionaries with lavish pay raises. However, he also purged many of Geta's supporters.

During his campaigns Caracalla let his mother, Julia Domna, who accompanied her son, to handle many official matters by correspondence and refer to him only major issues. In 213 he campaigned against the Alamanni, and in 214 he fought with the Danubian Carpi. Later he raised a Macedonian phalanx to emulate Alexander the Great, and marched through Asia and Syria to Alexandria, inviting mockery of many, whom he later executed. During his reign he bestowed, for reasons not entirely clear, Roman citizenship to all non-slaves living within the borders of the empire. The Baths of Caracalla in Rome are the most enduring monument of his rule.

Caracalla died in April 8, 217. He was murdered near Carrhae while en route to a campaign against the Parthians, the murder being committed by an evocatus attached to the Praetorian Guard on the order of a Praetorian prefect, the future emperor Macrinus.

=== Geta (209–211) ===
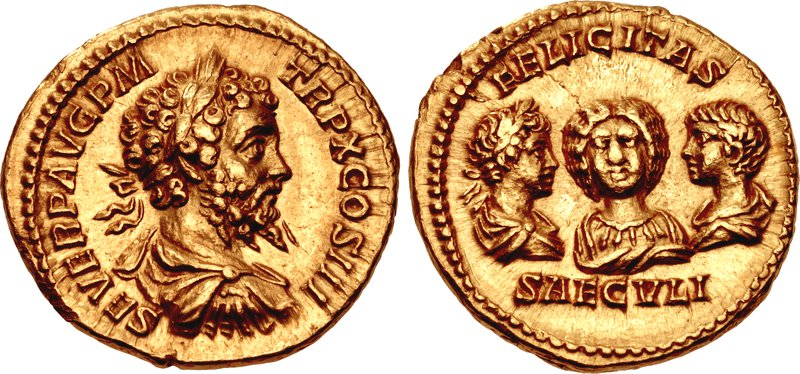
A dynastic aureus of Septimius Severus, minted in 202. The reverse feature the portraits of Geta (right), Julia Domna (centre), and Caracalla (left).

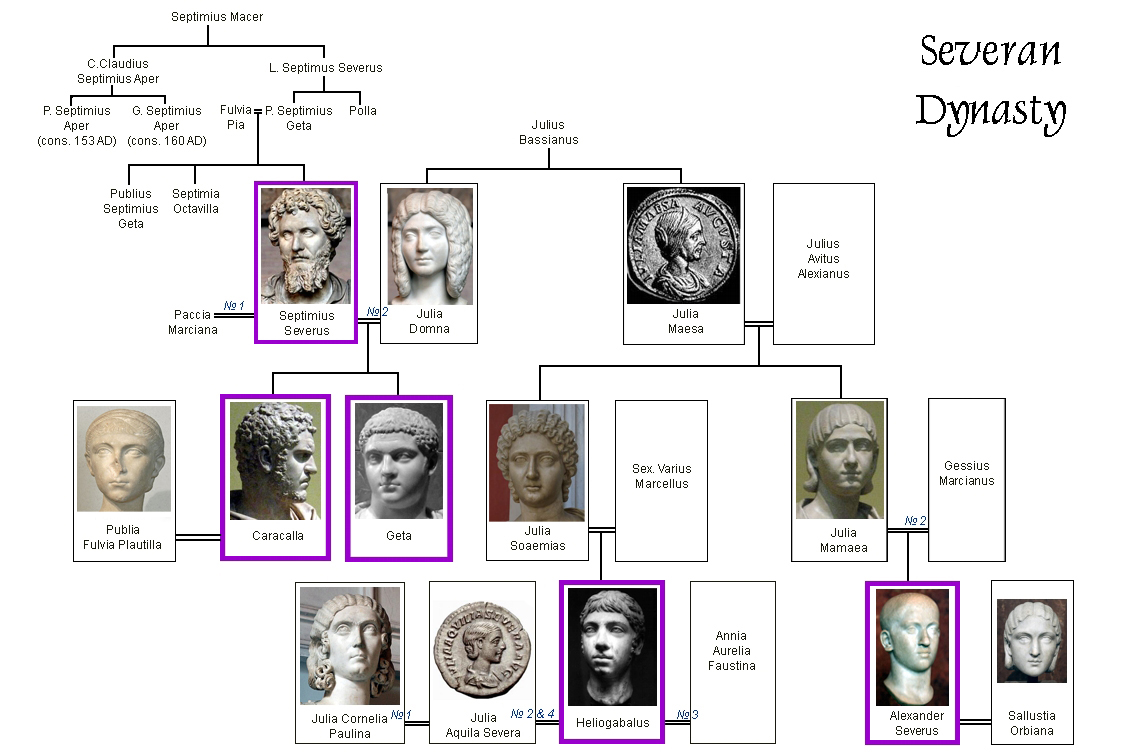
The Severan dynasty family tree

The younger of Severus' two sons, Geta, was born in 189. He was made caesar in 198 and co-augustus in 209 or 210 alongside his father and older brother Caracalla. Unlike the much more successful joint reign of Marcus Aurelius (r. 161–180) and his brother Lucius Verus (r. 161–169) the previous century, relations were hostile between the two Severan brothers.,

Soon after their father's death, Geta was murdered by his brother Caracalla. Geta was murdered in their mother's apartments, and died clung to his mother, by order of Caracalla, who then ruled as sole emperor.

=== Interlude: Macrinus (217–218) ===
Macrinus was the first Roman emperor who did not come from a senatorial family. He was born in 164 at Caesarea in Mauretania, now Cherchell, Algeria. Though not related to Severans while also being of just equestrian rank and having been born into a Moorish family, he rose through the ranks all the way to being a praetorian prefect under Caracalla. In 217 Macrinus became involved in a successful conspiracy to kill Caracalla, and soon after the murder troops saluted Macrinus as augustus.

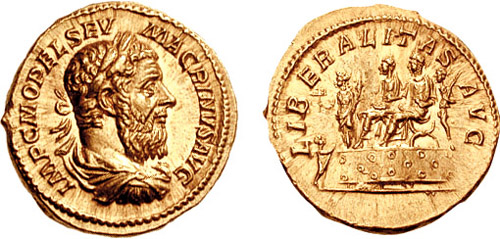
An aureus of Macrinus celebrating the "generosity of the emperor" (LIBERALITAS AVG)

He made peace with the Parthian Empire, which involved paying reparations for the damage caused by Caracalla's campaigns. His troops considered the terms degrading to the Romans. One of the reasons for his eventual downfall was his attempt at saving by paying serving soldiers of the Eastern troops by higher pay scales established during the rule of Caracalla while paying the new recruits by lower pay scales from the time of Septimius -- his troops were not impressed. Due to a continuing threat from Parthia, he kept the rebellious forces in Syria, where they became one way or the other acquainted with Elagabalus.

In May 218 troops camping near Elesa revolted and hailed Elegabalus as emperor. After months of rebellion and a failed attack on the rebellious troops, Macrinus met the army of Elagabalus near Antioch where he was decisively defeated. Macrinus managed to escape with his son to Chalcedon where he was apprehended to be taken back to Antioch, but the guards murdered him en route. During his rule Macrinus never entered the city of Rome.

=== Elagabalus (218–222) ===
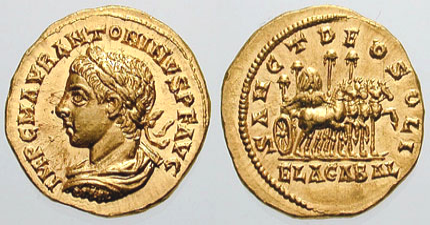
An aureus of Elagabalus, minted at Antioch. The reverse commemorates the journey to Rome of the sacred black stone of Emesus, which is depicted on the quadriga.

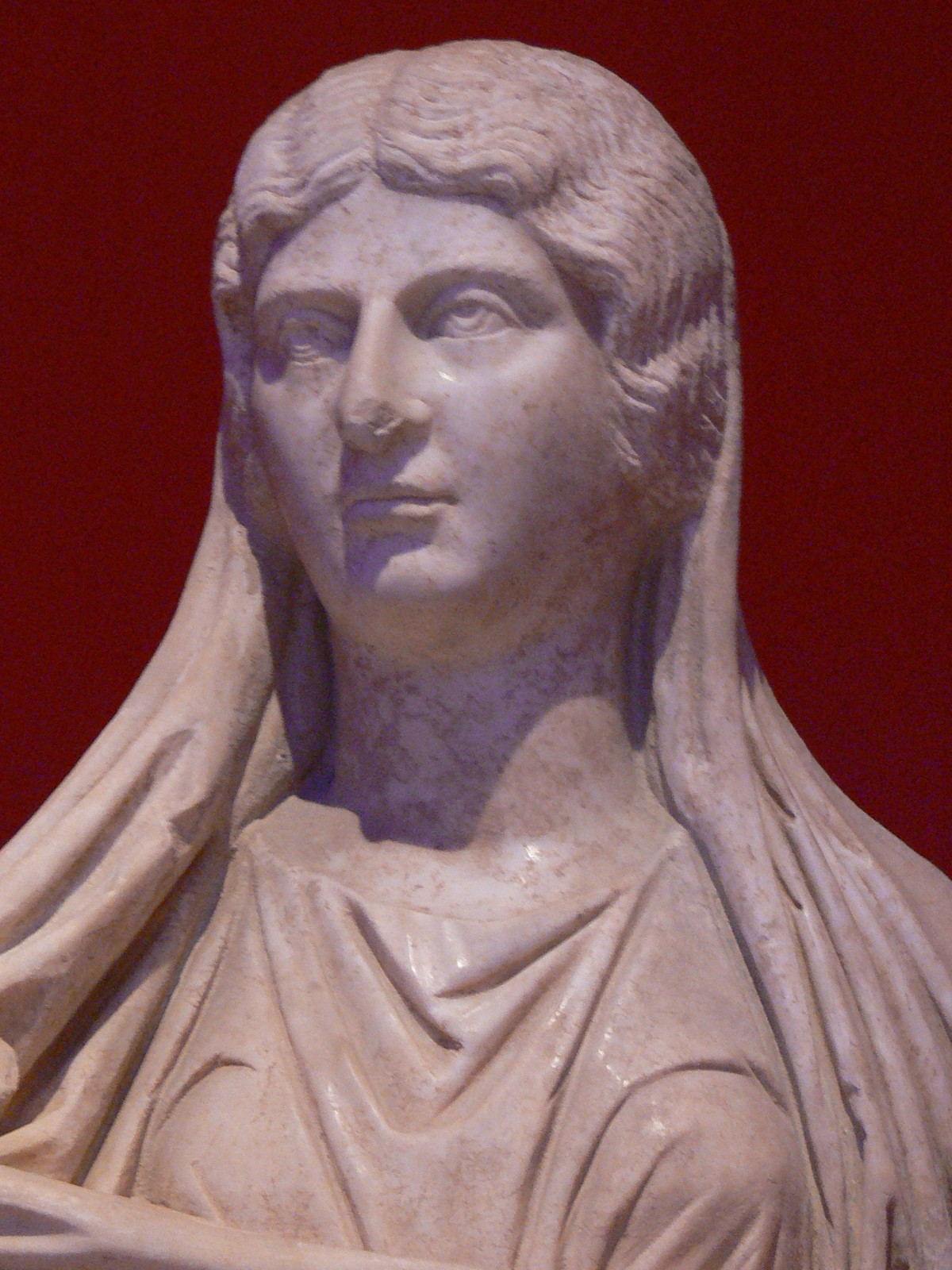
Julia Soaemias, mother of Elagabalus

Elagabalus was born Varius Avitus Bassianus in 203 and became known later as Marcus Aurelius Antonius. The name "Elagabalus" followed the Latin nomenclature for the Syrian sun god Elagabal, of whom he was a priest. At the age of 14, in 218, Elagabalus was crowned emperor by Gallic Third Legion.

There are two different versions how Elagabalus gained the throne. In one version of events, Elagabalus's grandmother, Julia Maesa, Julia Domna's sister and sister-in-law of Septimius Severus, persuaded the Legio III Gallica to rebel against Macrinus by claiming that Elagabalus was actually Caracalla's bastard son with one of her daughters. She also used her enormous wealth to get soldiers swear fealty to Elagabalus.

Having succeeded, Maesa and her family were invited to enter the camp, where Elagabalus was clad in imperial purple and crowned as emperor. Another account of the events tells how Elagabalus was being protected and raised by Gannys, a foster father and lover of his mother, Julia Soaemias. In this version of events, Gannys dressed young Elagabalus in Caracalla's childhood clothes and smuggled him into the camp at night, where soldiers eventually revolted the next morning. In any case, he arrived as emperor in Rome by summer 219.

Historical sources treat his reign negatively, but many of his failures can not be affirmed. However, epigraphical and numismatic evidence shows that Elagabalus did replace Jupiter with Elagabal in late 220, and he also married a Vestal Virgin called Aquilia Severa. In addition to these offences to Roman sensibilities, he was also accused of being murderous and bloodthirsty, but executions during his reign appear to be politically motivated instead of being the result of simple bloodlust. Many, if not all, stories about his effeminacy, extravagance, and licentiousness are imaginations of ancient authors.

In 221, seeing that her grandson's outrageous behaviour could mean the loss of power, Julia Maesa persuaded or forced Elagabalus to adopt his cousin, Severus Alexander, as caesar and his heir. At the same time he was forced divorce Aquilia in order to marry Annia Faustina, a relative of Marcus Aurelius, only to take Aquila back in a few months before the end of 221. Elagabalus also tried on several occasions to murder Alexander, which enraged the troops. In 222 Elagabalus was murdered and his corpse thrown into the sewer. The next day his cousin Alexander was hailed emperor by the troops.

=== Alexander Severus (222–235) ===
A bust of Severus Alexander, the last emperor of the Severan dynasty. Musée Saint-Raymond, Toulouse

Born Gessius Bassianus Alexianus in ca. 209, in 221 Alexander was adopted at by Elagabalus from whence he was called Marcus Aurelius Alexander Caesar. The adoption happened at the urging of Julia Maesa, who was the grandmother of both cousins.

His cousin Elagabalus had made several attempts at Alexander's life, which prompted the troops to mutiny, and things came to a head on March 6 when Elagabalus was put to death and Alexander raised to the throne.

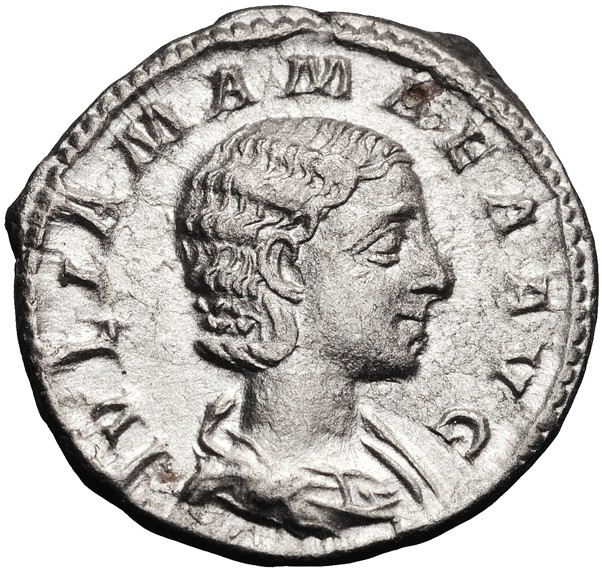
Alexander Severus's mother, Julia Avita Mamaea, advised her son during his minority.

Ruling from the age of 14 under the influence of his mother, Julia Avita Mamaea, ancient writers presented his reign as an efficient regime like the rule of Septimius Severus. The rising strength of the Sasanian Empire (r. 226–651) heralded perhaps the greatest external challenge that Rome faced in the 3rd century; however, in 231 Alexander organised an expedition to Parthia, nominally leading it, and by this did maintain control over the province of Mesopotamia.

Alexander's reign ended in early 235 when he was murdered, together with his mother, by his own troops while he was wintering in Germany where he was in order to prosecute a war in Upper Germania. He was deified in 238 after his memory had been condemned for a few years.

The death of Alexander was the epochal event beginning the troubled Crisis of the Third Century. His successor was Maximinus Thrax (r. 235–238), the first in a series of weak emperors, which ended 50 years later with the Tetrarchy instituted in the reign of Diocletian (r. 284–305).

== See also ==
- Severan art
- Marble of Thorigny
