= Julia Domna =

Roman empress from 193 to 211

- Augusta
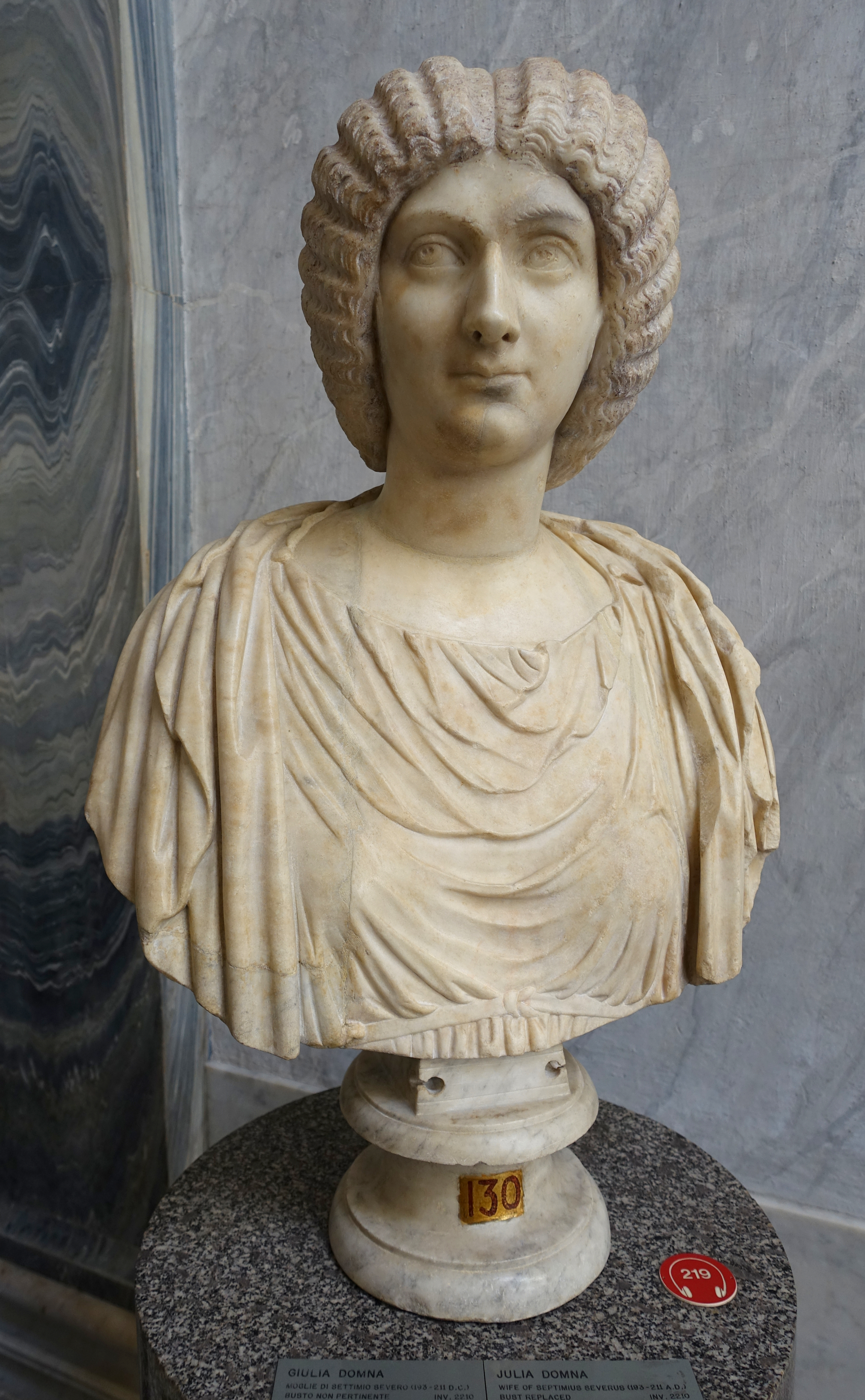
- Bust, Vatican Museums

Roman empress
- Tenure: 193–211
- Born: c. 160 AD; Emesa, Roman Syria
- Died: 217 (aged 56–57); Antioch
- Burial: Mausoleum of Hadrian, Italy
- Spouse: Septimius Severus (m. 187; died 211)
- Issue: Caracalla; Geta
Regnal name
- Julia Domna Augusta; Julia Augusta; Julia Pia Felix Augusta
- Dynasty: Emesan (by birth); Severan (by marriage)
- Father: Julius Bassianus

Julia Domna (Latin: [ˈjuːli.a ˈdomna]; c. 160 – 217 AD) was Roman empress from 193 to 211 as the wife of Emperor Septimius Severus. She was the first empress of the Severan dynasty. Domna was born in Emesa (present-day Homs) in Roman Syria to an Arab family of priests of the deity Elagabalus. In 187, she married Severus, then-governor of the Roman province of Gallia Lugdunensis. They had two sons, Caracalla and Geta. A civil war over the Roman throne broke out in 193, and shortly afterwards Severus declared himself emperor. The war ended in 197 with the defeat of the last of Severus's opponents.

As empress, Domna was famous for her political, social, and philosophical influence. She received titles such as "Mother of the Invincible Camps". (Note: Ancient Greek: Μήτηρ τῶν ἀηττήτων στρατοπέδων, romanized: Mḗtēr tôn aēttḗtōn stratopédōn; Latin: Mater invictorum castrorum.) After the elder of her sons, Caracalla, started ruling with his father, she was briefly co-empress with Caracalla's wife, Fulvia Plautilla, until the latter fell into disgrace. Following the death of Severus in 211, Domna became the first empress dowager to receive the title combination "Pia Felix Augusta", which may have implied greater powers being vested in her than what was usual for a Roman empress mother. Her sons jointly inherited the throne, and she acted as mediator in the conflicts that arose between them. Caracalla had Geta killed later that year.

Domna remained active in Caracalla's court, accompanying her son on the military campaigns which occupied most of his reign. During his war against Parthia she lived at Antioch (present-day Antakya, Turkey). There she killed herself in 217, upon hearing of Caracalla's assassination and the Severan dynasty's loss of power. Her older sister Julia Maesa restored the family's imperial status in 218.

== Family background ==
Julia Domna was born in Emesa (modern day Homs) in Syria around 160 AD to an Arab family that was part of the Emesene dynasty. Her name, Domna, is an archaic Arabic word meaning "black", referencing the nature of the sun god Elagabalus which took the form of a black stone. She was the youngest daughter of the high priest of Baal, Julius Bassianus, and sister to Julia Maesa. Through Maesa and her husband Julius Avitus, Domna had two nieces: Julia Soaemias and Julia Mamaea, the respective mothers of future Roman emperors Elagabalus (r. 218–222) and Severus Alexander (r. 222–235).

Domna's ancestors were priest kings of the temple of Elagabalus. The family had enormous wealth and was promoted to Roman senatorial aristocracy. Before her marriage, Domna inherited the estate of her paternal great-uncle Julius Agrippa, a former leading centurion.

=== Marriage ===
The Historia Augusta relates that, after losing his first wife around 186, politician Septimius Severus heard a foretelling of a woman in Syria who would marry a king. So Severus sought her as his wife. This woman was Domna. Bassianus accepted Severus' marriage proposal in early 187, and in the summer the couple married in Lugdunum (modern-day Lyon, France), of which Severus was the governor. The marriage proved happy, and Severus cherished Domna and her political opinions. Domna built "the most splendid reputation" by applying herself to letters and philosophy. She gave birth to their two sons, Lucius Septimius Bassianus in 188 in Lugdunum, and Publius Septimius Geta the following year in Rome.

== Civil war ==
After the Roman emperor Commodus was murdered without an heir in 192, many contenders rushed for the throne, including Domna's husband Severus. An elder senator, Pertinax, was appointed by the Praetorian Guard as the new emperor of Rome. But when Pertinax would not meet the Guard's demands, he too was murdered. Another politician, Didius Julianus, was called to Rome and appointed emperor. Severus, coming from the north into Rome, overthrew Julianus and had him executed.

Severus claimed the title of emperor in 193. By offering Clodius Albinus, a powerful governor of Britannia, the rank of Caesar (successor), Severus could focus on his other rival to the throne, Pescennius Niger, whom he defeated at the Battle of Issus in 194. When afterwards Severus openly declared his son Caracalla as his successor, Clodius Albinus was hailed emperor by his troops. At the Battle of Lugdunum in 197, Severus defeated and killed Albinus, establishing himself as Emperor. Thus, Domna became Empress-consort.

== Power and influence ==
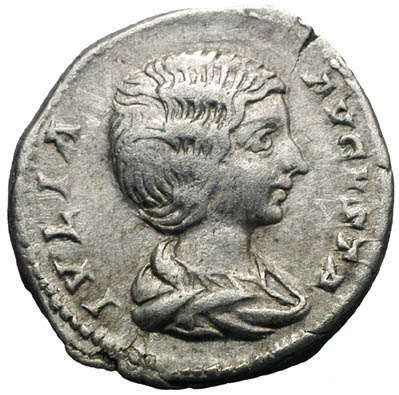
Coin featuring Domna (IVLIA AVGVSTA).

Unlike most imperial wives, Domna remarkably accompanied her husband on his military campaigns and stayed in camp with the army. As worded by Barbara Levick, Domna "was to exceed all other empresses in the number and variety of her official titles." Honorary titles were granted to Domna similar to those given to Faustina the Younger, including "Mother of the Invincible Camps", and Mater Augustus (Mother of Augustus). (Note: According to Caillan Davenport, there is significant controversy about the dating of the titles Mater senatus (Mother of the Senate) and Mater patriae (Mother of the Fatherland), which, "as Rowan (2011) 254 points out, [...] only occur on coinage minted after Severus' death, which is surely a significant development in the official presentation of the Augusta's public image.") She was respected and viewed positively for most of her tenure, as indicated by coins minted with her portrait that mention her titles or simply refer to her as "Julia Augusta". The title Pia Felix Augusta (Latin: [ˈpi.a ˈfeːliːks au̯ˈɡusta]) which she received after Severus' death was "perhaps a way of implying that Domna had absorbed and was continuing her husband's attributes" after his death.

Several medallions for Domna were issued by Severus as early as 207, on the reverses of which is "Vesta Mater" (Mother Vesta), which, according to Molly M. Lindner, "could refer to an invocation to Vesta during prayers and supplications that the Vestal Virgins made whenever they prayed publicly". According to Lindner,

While some scholars have proposed that Julia Domna's medallions commemorate the restoration of the Temple of Vesta by the empress, Melanie Grunow Sobocinski pointed out that [the temple] burned down in 191, whereas Julia Domna's use of Vestal iconography does not occur until 207. Either the reconstruction of [the temple] took more than fifteen years, or Julia Domna had a different motivation, perhaps one connected to her role as the mother of Septimius Severus' heirs, as the legend on the reverses suggests.

== Transition of power ==
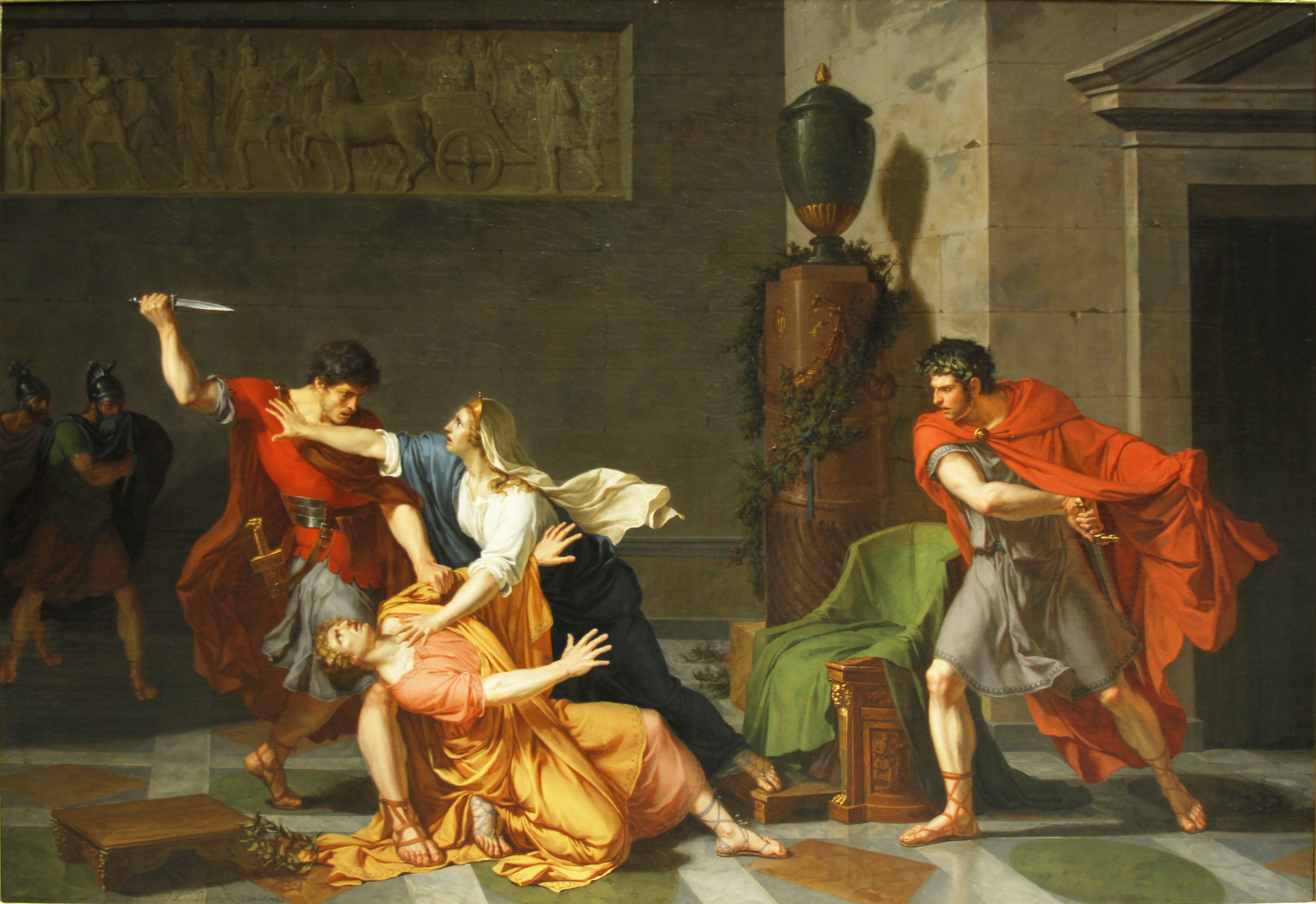
Geta Dying in his Mother's Arms, Jacques-Augustin-Catherine Pajou, 1766–1828 (Staatsgalerie Stuttgart)

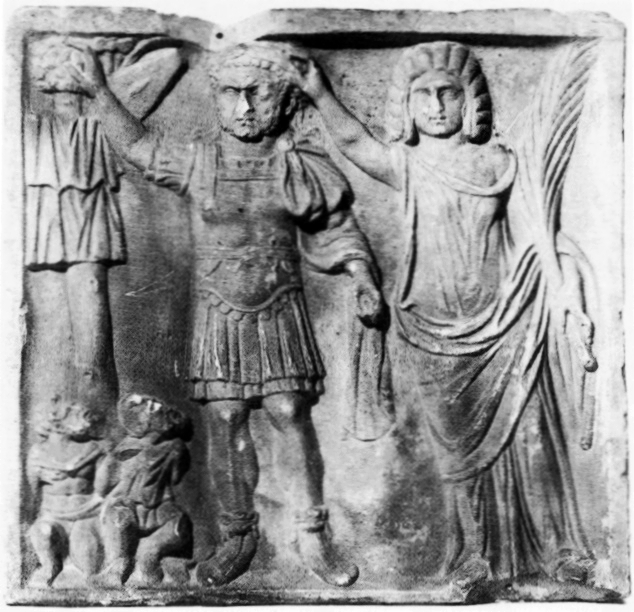
Relief of Caracalla with Domna as Victoria, National Museum, Warsaw

When Severus died in 211 in Eboracum (York), Domna became the mediator between their two sons, Caracalla and Geta, who were supposed to rule as joint emperors, according to their father's wishes expressed in his will. However, the two young men had a discordant relationship, and Geta was murdered by Caracalla's soldiers in December of the same year. Geta's name was then removed from inscriptions and his image erased as the result of a damnatio memoriae. As explained by Caillan Davenport:

[Caracalla] spent the majority of his reign outside Rome, departing the city in late 212 or early 213 for a campaign against the Alemanni on the Rhine, for which he claimed the title Germanicus Maximus. After a rocky—and near fatal—crossing of the Hellespont, the emperor and his court established themselves at Nicomedia in Bithynia during the winter of 213/4. Caracalla's mother, Julia Domna, accompanied her son on his provincial tour. There is only circumstantial evidence for her presence in Germany, but she was certainly at court in Nicomedia, and later resided at Antioch in 216.

=== Death ===
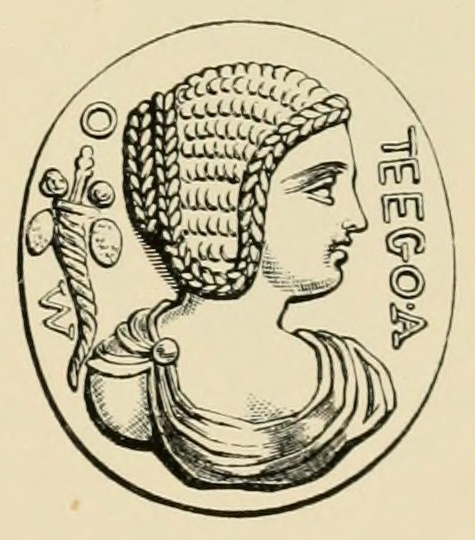
Lady with her hair dressed in the fashion first set by Julia Domna. The disguised legend reads Amo te ego.

In 217, Caracalla began a new war with Parthia. Domna went with Caracalla as far as Antioch. There she stayed, helping to deal with his correspondence, while he went on to the frontier. During the campaign, Caracalla was assassinated by a Roman soldier. Domna chose to commit suicide after hearing about the rebellion, perhaps a decision hastened by the fact that she was suffering from breast cancer, as well as a reluctance to return to private life. Her sister, Julia Maesa, restored the Severan dynasty in 218. Domna's body was brought to Rome and placed in the Sepulcrum C. et L. Caesaris (perhaps a separate chamber in the Mausoleum of Augustus). Later, however, both her bones and those of Geta were transferred by Maesa to the Mausoleum of Hadrian.

== Legacy ==
Domna encouraged Philostratus to write the Life of Apollonius of Tyana, but is thought to have died before he finished the eight-volume work. She also influenced Roman fashion: the hairstyle that she used would later be worn by Roman empress Cornelia Salonina and Palmyran queen Zenobia. Domna seems to have made the wearing of wigs, a custom of Assyrians, popular among Romans.

The scholar C.T. Mallan remarks upon the analysis of Domna's career given by Cassius Dio, a contemporary observer who "held the former Augusta in high esteem": "Dio concludes that Julia's life was ultimately an unhappy one, a life without pleasure or enduring good fortune... [it] is noteworthy, and perhaps significant that the only other individual to attract a similar eulogy in [Dio's] Roman History was Marcus Aurelius". According to Mallan, Dio may have seen a parallel between Domna and Aurelius, both virtuous philosophers whose later lives were troubled by the bad character of their sons.

== Severan dynasty family tree ==
Severan family tree

Septimius Macer
Gaius Claudius Septimius Aper	Fulvius Pius	Lucius Septimius Severus
Publius Septimius Aper	Gaius Septimius Aper	Fulvia Pia	Publius Septimius Geta	Septimia Polla	Julius Bassianus
Septimius	Publius Septimius Geta	Septimia Octavilla	Paccia Marciana (1)	Septimius Severus (r. 193–211)	Julia Domna (2)	Julia Maesa	Gaius Julius Avitus Alexianus
Gaius Septimius Severus Aper	Fulvia Plautilla	Caracalla (r. 197–217)	Geta (r. 209–211)	Julia Soaemias	Sextus Varius Marcellus	Julia Avita Mamaea	Unknown (2)
Julia Cornelia Paula (1)	Aquilia Severa (2 and 4)	Elagabalus (r. 218–222)	Annia Faustina (3)	Sallustia Orbiana	Severus Alexander (r. 222–235)

- (1) = 1st spouse
- (2) = 2nd spouse
- (3) = 3rd spouse
- (4) = 4th spouse
- Dark green indicates an emperor of the Severan dynasty

Notes:

Except where otherwise noted, the notes below indicate that an individual's parentage is as shown in the above family tree.

Bibliography:

- Birley, Anthony R. (1999). Septimius Severus: The African Emperor. London: Routledge. ISBN 0415165911.
- Gibbon, Edward; Smith, William (1889). The Student's Gibbon: The Decline and Fall of the Roman Empire. London: Murray. OCLC 993285639.

== Sources ==
- Baharal, Drora (1992). "The Portraits of Julia Domna from the Years 193–211 A.D. and the Dynastic Propaganda of L. Septimius Severus". Latomus. 51 (T. 51, Fasc. 1): 110–118. JSTOR 41536198.
- Ball, Warwick (2016). Rome in the East: The Transformation of an Empire. Taylor & Francis. ISBN 978-1-317-29634-8.
- Bédoyère, Guy de la (2018). Domina: The Women Who Made Imperial Rome. Yale University Press. ISBN 9780300230307.
- Bernario, H. W. (1958). "Julia Domna: Mater Senatus et Patriae". Phoenix. 12 (2): 67–70. doi:10.2307/1086523. JSTOR 1086523.
- Birley, Anthony (1999). Septimius Severus: The African Emperor. Routledge. ISBN 0-203-02859-7.
- Bowersock, Glen Warren (1994). Roman Arabia. Harvard University Press. ISBN 978-0-674-77756-9.
- Bowman, Alan; Garnsey, Peter; Cameron, Averil (2005). The Cambridge Ancient History: Volume 12, The Crisis of Empire, AD 193–337. Cambridge University Press. ISBN 978-0-521-30199-2.
- Burns, Jasper (2006). Great Women of Imperial Rome: Mothers and Wives of the Caesars. Routledge. ISBN 9781134131853.
- Collingwood, R. G. (Robin George) (1998) [1936]. Roman Britain and the English settlements. Myres, J. N. L. (John Nowell Linton). New York: Biblo and Tannen. ISBN 0819611603. OCLC 36750306.
- Davenport, Caillan (2017-08-02). "The Sexual Habits of Caracalla: Rumour, Gossip, and Historiography" (PDF). Histos. 75 (100). ISSN 2046-5963.
- Dunstan, William E. (2011). Ancient Rome. Lanham: Rowman and Littlefield. ISBN 978-0-7425-6832-7.
- Dzielska, Maria; Stucchi, Sandro (1986). Apollonius of Tyana in Legend and History. L'ERMA di BRETSCHNEIDER. ISBN 88-7062-599-0.
- Fishwick, Duncan (2005). The Imperial Cult in the Latin West: Studies in the Ruler Cult of the Western Provinces of the Roman Empire. E.J. Brill. ISBN 9789004071797.
- Gagarin, Michael (2010). The Oxford Encyclopedia of Ancient Greece and Rome. Oxford University Press. ISBN 978-0-1951-7072-6.
- Gibbon, Edward (1831). The History of the Decline and Fall of the Roman Empire. New York.
- Goldsworthy, Adrian (2009). How Rome Fell: death of a superpower. New Haven: Yale University Press. ISBN 978-0-300-16426-8.
- Greenwalt, William S. (2000). Commire, Anne; Klezmer, Deborah (eds.). Women in World History. Yorkin Publications. ISBN 9780787640675.
- Jones, Christopher P. (2005). Philostratus, The Life of Apollonius of Tyana. Harvard University Press.
- Langford, Julie (2013). Maternal Megalomania: Julia Domna and the Imperial Politics of Motherhood. JHU Press. ISBN 9781421408484.
- Levick, Barbara (2007). Julia Domna: Syrian Empress. Routledge. ISBN 978-1-134-32351-7.
- Lindner, Molly M. (2015). Portraits of the Vestal Virgins: Priestesses of Ancient Rome. Ann Arbor, MI: University of Michigan Press. ISBN 9780472118953.
- Mallan, C. T. “Cassius Dio on Julia Domna: A Study of the Political and Ethical Functions of Biographical Representation in Dio’s ‘Roman History.’” Mnemosyne, vol. 66, no. 4/5, 2013, pp. 734–60. JSTOR, http://www.jstor.org/stable/24521884. Accessed 8 Feb. 2025.
- Potter, David S (2004). The Roman Empire at Bay AD 180–395. Routledge. ISBN 0-415-10058-5.
- Rahman, Abdur (2001). The African Emperor? The Life, Career, and Rise to Power of Septimius Severus, MA thesis. University of Wales Lampeter. Archived from the original on 2017-10-29.
- Rodinson, Maxime (1981). The Arabs. Translated by Goldhammer, Arthur. University of Chicago Press. ISBN 978-0-2267-2356-3. LCCN 80025916.
- Rowlandson, Jane; Bagnall, Roger S. (1998). Women and Society in Greek and Roman Egypt: A Sourcebook. Cambridge University Press. ISBN 9780521588157.
- Salisbury, Joyce E. (2001). Encyclopedia of Women in the Ancient World. ABC-CLIO. p. 183. ISBN 9781576070925.
- Shahîd, Irfan (1984). Rome and the Arabs: A Prolegomenon to the Study of Byzantium and the Arabs. Dumbarton Oaks Research Library and Collection. ISBN 0-88402-115-7.
- Société française de numismatique et d'archéologie (1873). Comptes rendus de la Société française de numismatique et d'archéologie (in French). Vol. IV. Paris.
- Southern, Pat (2008). Empress Zenobia: Palmyra's Rebel Queen. Bloomsbury Publishing. ISBN 978-1-441-17351-5.
- Southern, Pat (2015). The Roman Empire from Severus to Constantine. Routledge. ISBN 978-1-138-82669-4.

Royal titles
Preceded by Manlia Scantilla	Empress of Rome; 193–211 with Fulvia Plautilla (202–205)	Succeeded by Nonia Celsa
