= Julius Bassianus =

Syrian high priest of Elagabalus (died 217)

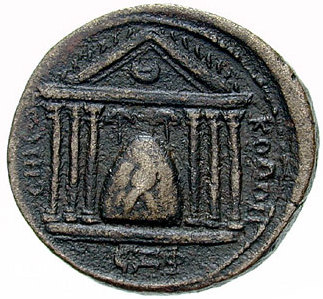
The black stone of Elagabalus in the Emesene Temple of the Sun.

Julius Bassianus (born in the first half of the 2nd century, died 217) was an Arab high priest of Elagabalus at the Temple of the Sun in Emesa, Syria, where this solar deity was worshipped in a shape of a black stone. The name Elagabalus derives from Ilāh (a Semitic word for "god") and gabal (an Arabic word for "mountain"), resulting in "the God of the Mountain," the Emesene manifestation of the deity. Bassianus was a member of the Royal family of Emesa (modern Homs), which was a part of the Arab aristocracy in this client kingdom of the Roman Empire. The beginning of his priesthood is unknown, but by 187 he was a high priest at Emesa. Bassianus was a son of a Julius and his paternal uncle was Julius Agrippa, who served as a Primipilaris (a former leading Centurion).

Future emperor Lucius Septimius Severus had visited Emesa, based on a promising horoscope that he would find his future wife in Syria. Bassianus introduced Severus to his two daughters. Bassianus' wife is unknown. His elder daughter Julia Maesa was married to a Syrian noble Gaius Julius Avitus Alexianus and they had two daughters: Julia Soaemias Bassiana and Julia Avita Mamaea. His younger daughter Julia Domna was not married. Severus and Domna married not so long after. Domna bore Severus two sons, Lucius Septimius Bassianus (Caracalla, 4 April 188-8 April 217) and Publius Septimius Geta (7 March 189-19 December 211). Caracalla and Geta would become future Roman Emperors and heirs to their father. After Caracalla's death, Julia Maesa's grandson became emperor, Elagabalus. She prevailed upon him to adopt another grandson of her, the son of Julia Avita Mamaea, who took the name Alexander Severus. Eventually the latter became emperor himself.

Julius Bassianus is a possible descendant of Gaius Julius Alexion.

== Severan dynasty family tree ==
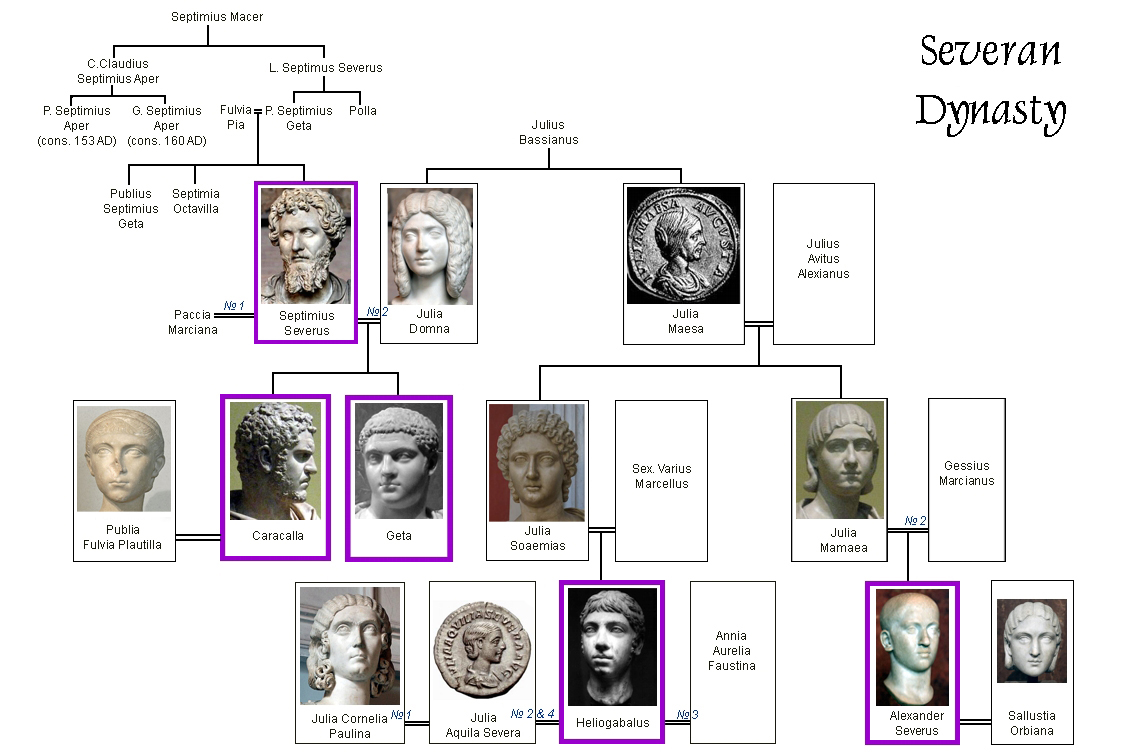

== See also ==
- Emesan Dynasty
- Julia Domna
- Elagabalus (deity)

== Sources ==
- Birley, A.R. (2002). Septimius Severus: The African Emperor. Routledge.
- Levick, B. (2007). Julia Domna: Syrian Empress. Routledge.
