= Elagabalium =

Roman temple

- Plan of the Elagabalium. On the lower-left the plan of the church of San Sebastiano al Palatino.

- Shown in ancient Rome
- Interactive map of Elagabalium
- 41°53′23″N 12°29′19″E

The Elagabalium was a temple built by the Roman emperor Elagabalus, located on the north-east corner of the Palatine Hill. During Elagabalus' reign from 218 until 222, the Elagabalium was the center of a controversial religious cult, dedicated to Elagabalus, of which the emperor himself was the high priest.

== History ==
The temple was a colonnaded structure some 70 metres by 40 metres, in front of the Colosseum, within a colonnaded enclosure. The temple platform was originally built under Domitian between 81 and 96, and may have been a place of worship to Jupiter. The remnants of this terrace are still visible today at the north-east corner of the Palatine Hill.

When Elagabalus became emperor in 218 the temple was expanded and rededicated to the god Elagabal, the patron deity of his homeplace Emesa in Syria. Elagabal was personified by a conical black stone, which has been suggested to have been a piece of meteorite rock.

After Elagabalus' death the temple was again dedicated to Jupiter by Severus Alexander. A second, smaller temple to the god Elagabal was built where the church of Santa Croce in Gerusalemme now stands. If still in use by the 4th-century, it would have been closed during the persecution of pagans in the late Roman Empire.

== The cult of Elagabalus ==
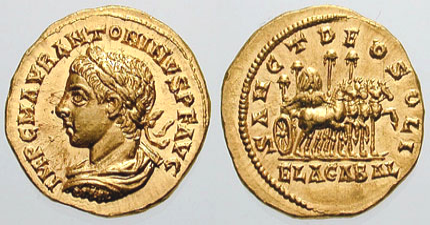
Roman aureus depicting Elagabalus. The reverse reads Sanct Deo Soli Elagabal, and depicts a four-horse, gold chariot carrying the holy stone of the Emesa temple.

Since the reign of Septimius Severus, sun worship had increased throughout the Empire. Elagabalus saw this as an opportunity to set up his god, El-Gabal or Elagabal, as the chief deity of the Roman pantheon. Elagabal was placed over even Jupiter. As a sign of the union between the two religions, Elagabalus gave either Astarte, Minerva, Urania, or some combination of the three, to Elagabal as a wife. Herodian writes that Elagabalus forced senators to watch while he danced around the altar of Elagabal to the sound of drums and cymbals, and that each summer solstice became a great festival to Elagabal popular with the masses because of its widely distributed food. During this festival, Elagabalus (also known as Heliogabalus, syncretised with Greek hēlios, the sun) placed Elagabal on a chariot adorned with gold and jewels, which he paraded through the city, after which he threw gifts into the Roman crowds:

After thus bringing the god out and placing him in the temple, Heliogabalus performed the rites and sacrifices described above; then, climbing to the huge, lofty towers which he had erected, he threw down, indiscriminately, cups of gold and silver, clothing, and cloth of every type to the mob below.

The most sacred relics from the Roman religion were transferred from their respective shrines to the Elagabalium, including the Great Mother, the fire of Vesta, the Shields of the Salii and the Palladium. Ancient history records lurid tales of human sacrifice taking place inside the temple, involving children which were collected all over Italy from the richest and noblest families. The religious excesses of Elagabalus' reign eventually contributed to his demise. On March 11, 222, Elagabalus was killed by members of the Praetorian Guard, and replaced by his cousin Severus Alexander. Elagabalus' religious edicts were reversed, and the statues which had been moved to the Elagabalium were restored to their original shrines.

== See also ==
- List of Ancient Roman temples
