= Geta (emperor) =

Roman emperor from 209 to 211

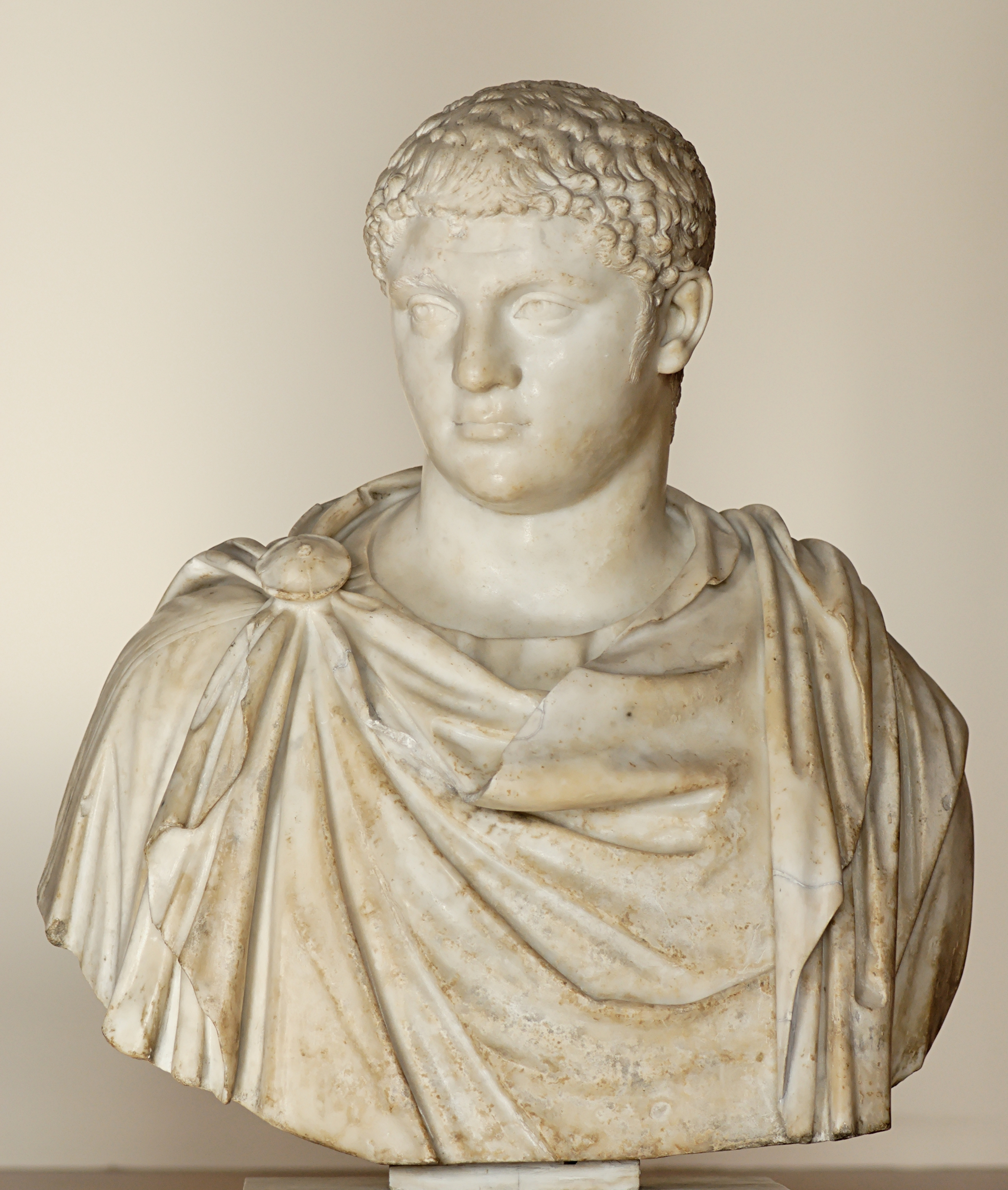
- Bust in the Louvre

Roman emperor
- Augustus: late 209 – December 211 (senior from 2 February 211)
- Predecessor: Septimius Severus
- Successor: Caracalla
- Co-emperors: Septimius Severus (until 211); Caracalla
- Caesar: 28 January 198 – late 209
- Born: 7 March 189; Rome
- Died: 26 December 211 (aged 22)
Names
- Publius Septimius Geta
Regnal name
- Imperator Caesar Publius Septimius Geta Augustus
- Dynasty: Severan
- Father: Septimius Severus
- Mother: Julia Domna

Publius Septimius Geta (/ˈɡɛtə/ GHET-ə; 7 March 189 – 26 December 211) was Roman emperor with his father Septimius Severus and older brother Caracalla from 209 to 211. Severus died in February 211 and intended for his sons to rule together, but proving incapable of sharing power, Geta was murdered in December of that year.

== Early life ==
Geta was the younger son of Septimius Severus by his second wife Julia Domna. He was born on 7 March 189 in either Rome or Mediolanum, at a time when his father was only a provincial governor at the service of Emperor Commodus. For a while Geta seems to have varyingly been given either the praenomen Publius or Lucius, but after 205 it remained Publius. The use of Lucius may have been to differentiate him from his uncle Publius Septimius Geta, which became unneeded when his uncle died in 204. On 28 January 198, Geta was raised to caesar (heir). Septimius Severus gave him the title of augustus (emperor) in late 209, perhaps in September or October.

During the campaign against the Britons in the early 3rd century AD, imperial propaganda promoted the image of a happy family that shared the responsibilities of rule. Geta's brother Caracalla acted as Severus' second-in-command, and administrative and bureaucratic duties were Geta's responsibility. In reality, however, the rivalry and antipathy between the brothers did not abate. With the death of Severus in 211, control of the empire passed to Geta and Caracalla jointly.

== Joint emperor ==
When Septimius Severus died in Eboracum on 4 February 211, Caracalla and Geta were proclaimed joint emperors and returned to Rome. Their mother, Julia Domna, who had served as a crucial advisor and confidante to her husband, was able to maintain her political influence over the two co-emperors. It is said that on the journey from Britain to Rome the two brothers kept away from each other, not once lodging in the same house or sharing a common meal.

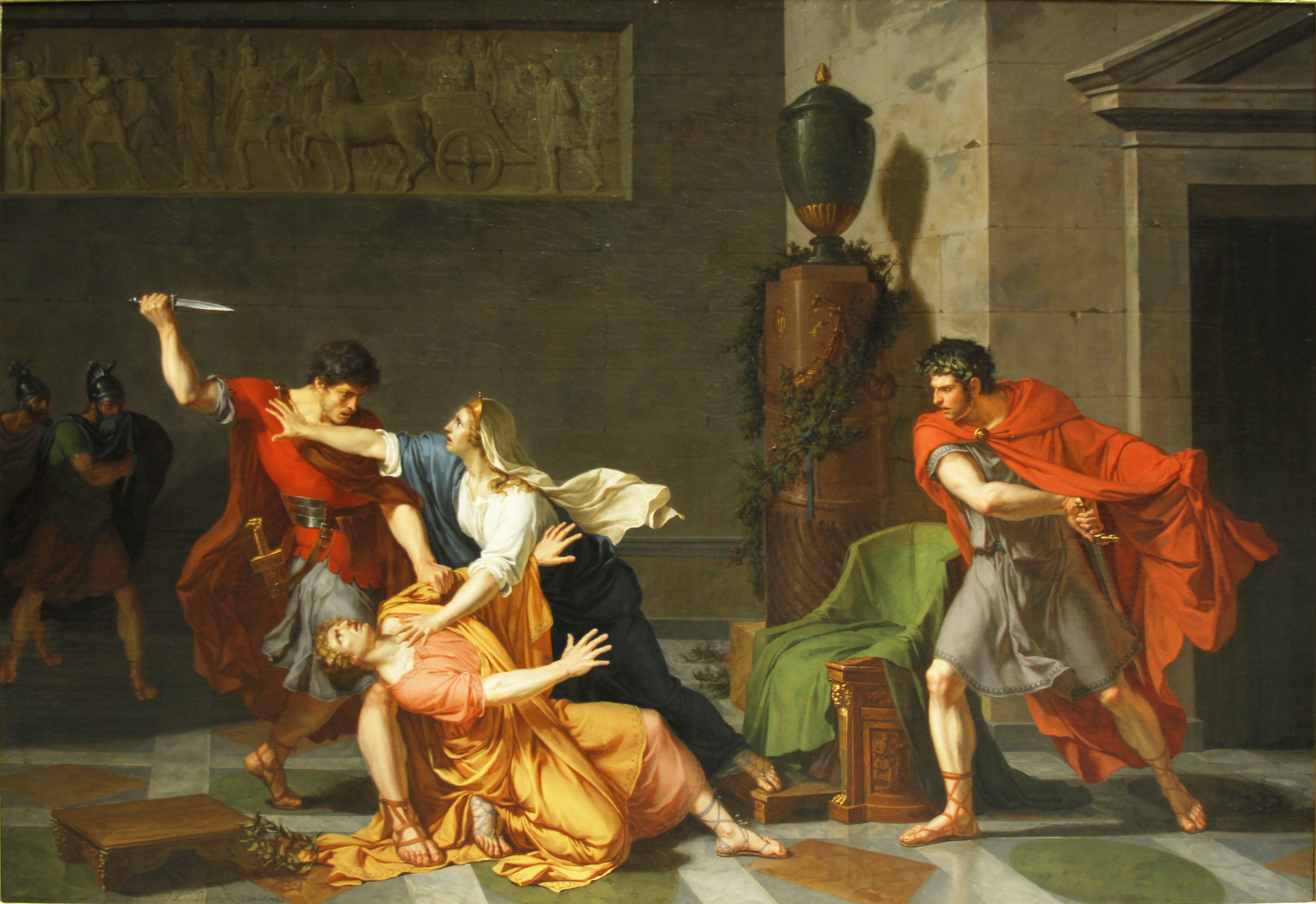
Geta Dying in his Mother's Arms, Jacques-Augustin-Catherine Pajou, 1766–1828 (Staatsgalerie Stuttgart)

Their joint rule was a failure. The Imperial Palace was divided into two separate sections, and neither allowed the servants of the other into his own. They only met in the presence of their mother, and with a strong military guard, being in constant fear of assassination. The current stability of their joint government was only through the mediation and leadership of their mother, Julia Domna, accompanied by other senior courtiers and generals in the military. The historian Herodian asserted that the brothers decided to split the empire in two halves, but with the strong opposition of their mother, the idea was rejected, when, by the end of 211, the situation had become unbearable. Caracalla tried unsuccessfully to murder Geta during the festival of Saturnalia (17 December). Finally, the next week, Caracalla had their mother arrange a peace meeting with his brother in her apartments, thus depriving Geta of his bodyguards, and then had him murdered in her arms by centurions.

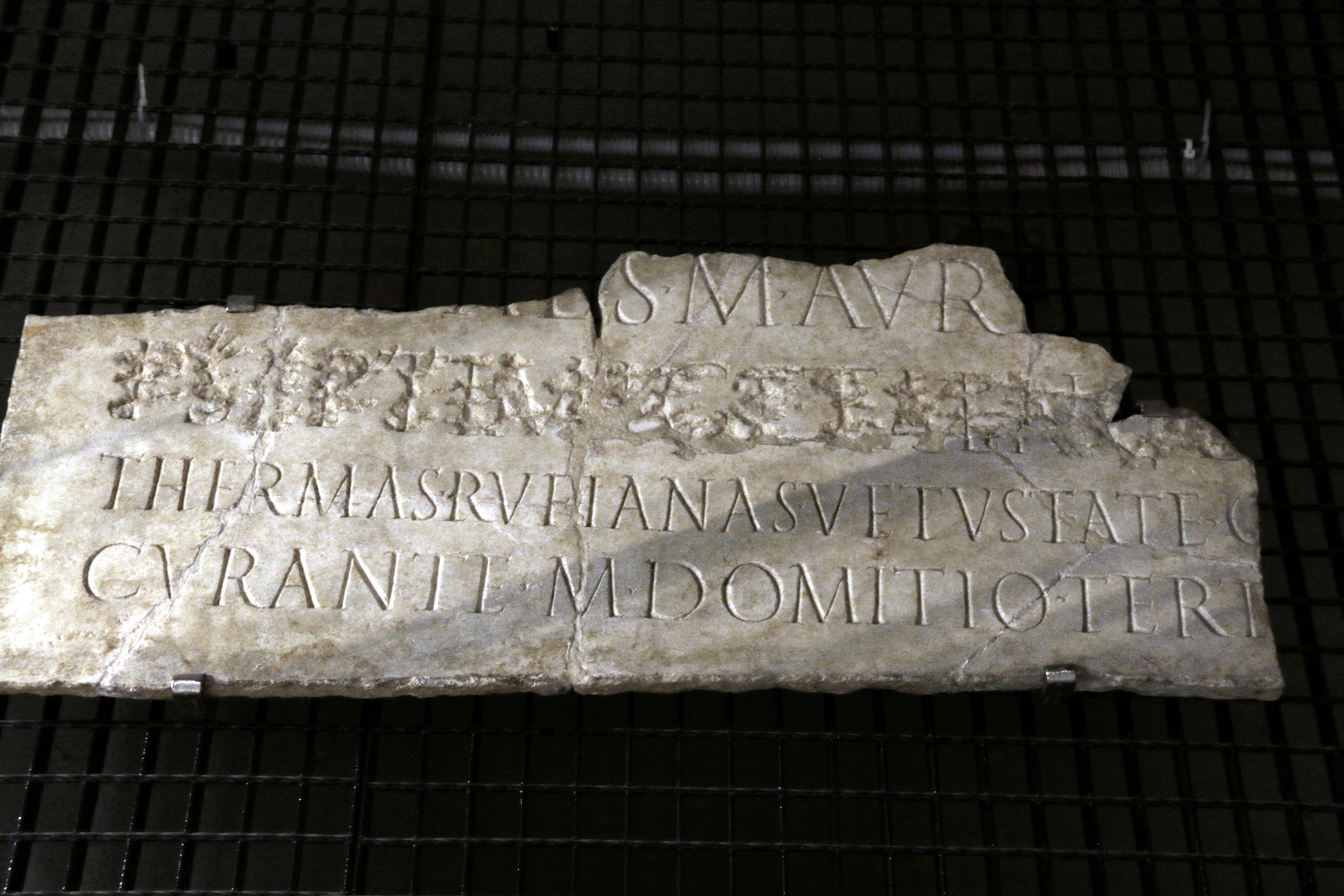
Erased mention of Geta in an inscription after his damnatio memoriae (Museo Archeologico Nazionale di Cagliari)

Caracalla ordered the damnatio memoriae, which was thoroughly carried out, as is clear from the archaeological record. Reportedly, Caracalla was thereafter tormented by guilt over his deed, but sought to expiate it by adding to this crime the proscription of all his brother's former followers. Cassius Dio stated that around 20,000 men and women were killed or proscribed on this charge during this time.

== Portrait ==
Very few marble portraits attributable to Geta survive to date, presumably due to the very thorough damnatio memoriae which resulted in the erasing of his images. However, Roman coins with his image are plentiful, and can reflect how his father Septimius Severus and mother Julia Domna and later Geta himself wanted him to be seen by the Roman people (and especially the Roman military).

Images of Geta and his older brother Caracalla cannot be well distinguished until the death of the father. Both sons were supposed to be presented as equally suitable heirs to the throne, showing thus more "depth" to the dynasty.

On his coins, Caracalla, who became Augustus in 198, was shown with a wreath of laurels, while Geta remained bareheaded until he himself became Augustus in 209. Between 209 and their father's death in February 211, both brothers were shown as equally mature young men with a short full beard, ready to take over the empire. Between the death of Septimus Severus and the assassination of Geta, Caracalla's portraits did not change, while Geta was depicted with a long beard with hanging hairs, much like his father, a strong indication of Geta's efforts to be seen as the "true" successor of his father.

The Severan Tondo panel painting depicts Septimius Severus and his family with an obliterated face assumed to be Geta.

== Gallery ==
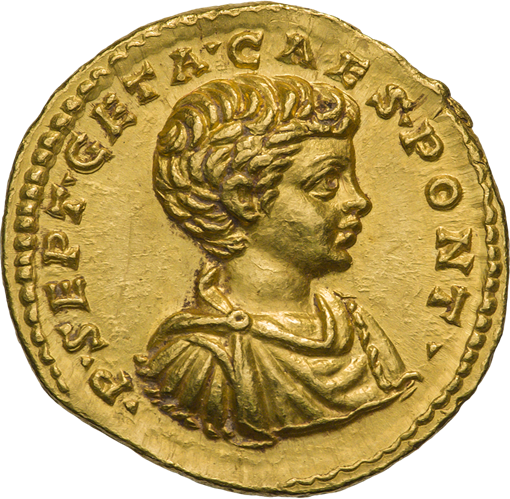
An aureus of Geta as caesar.

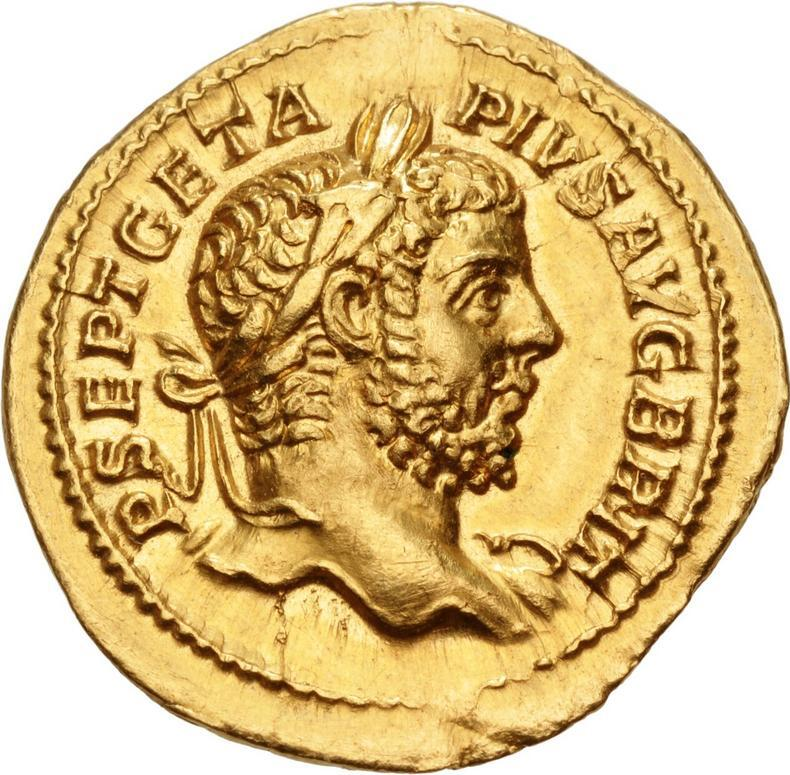
Rare aureus of Geta as augustus.

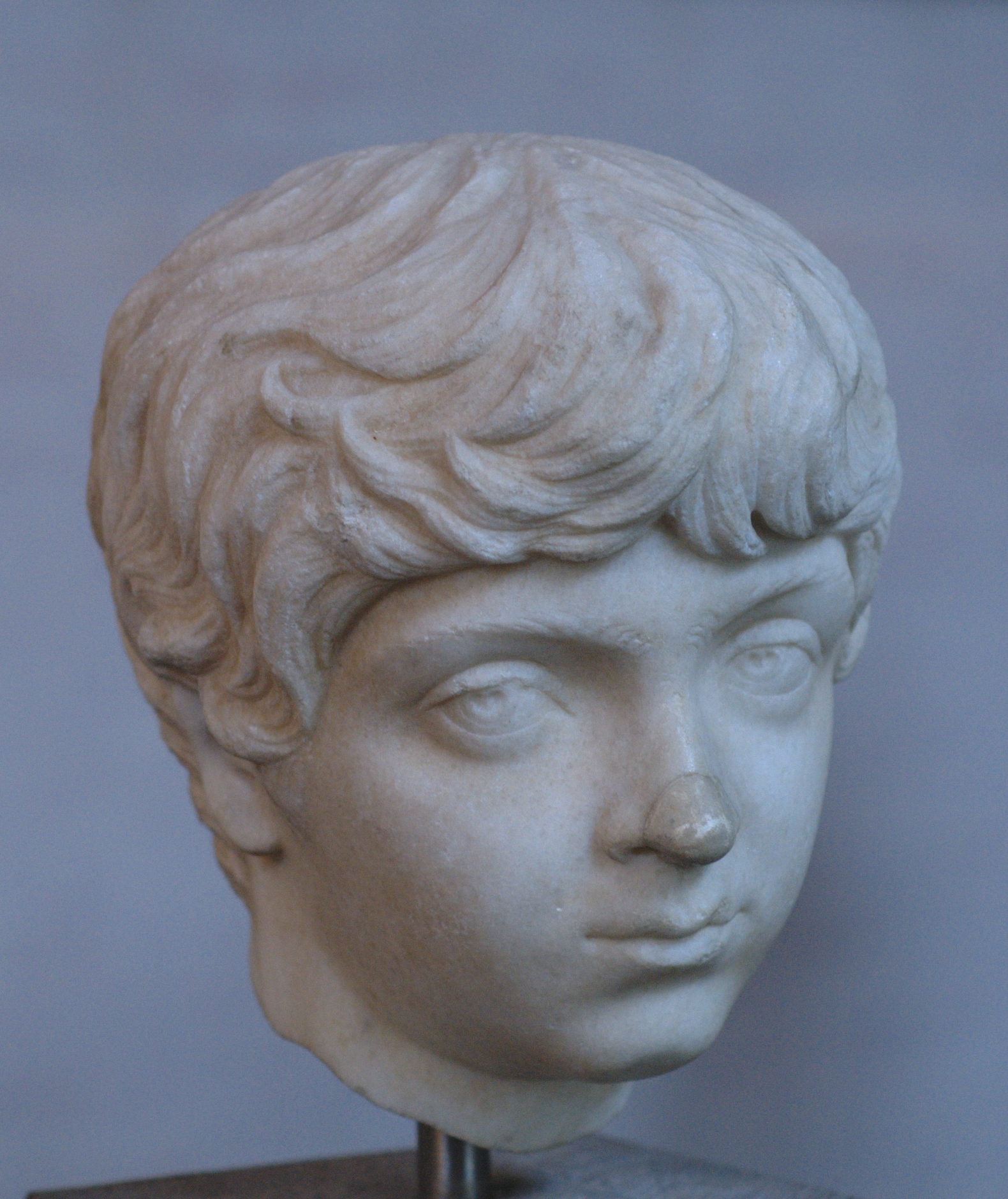
Head of young Geta at Glyptothek, Munich

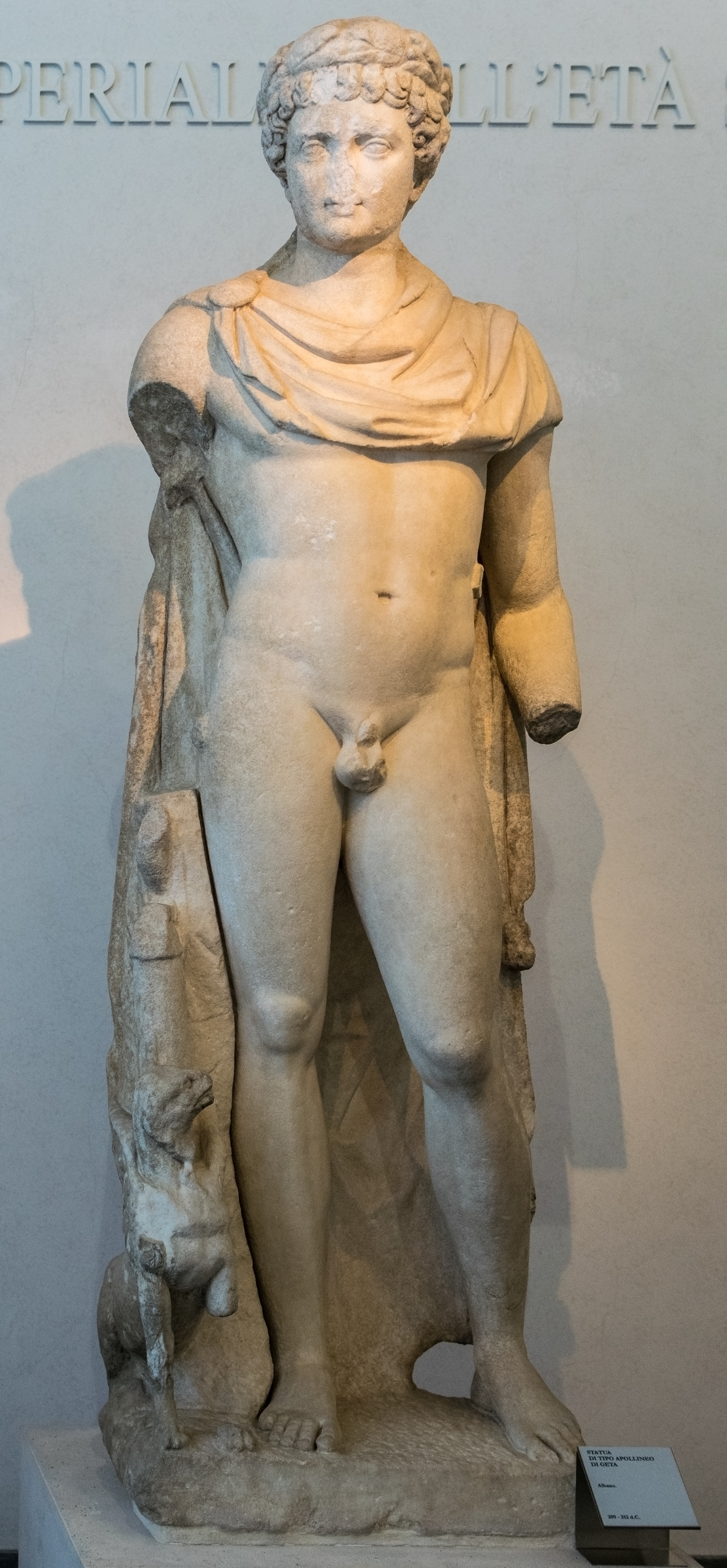
Geta in the form of Apollo at Rome, Palazzo Massimo alle Terme

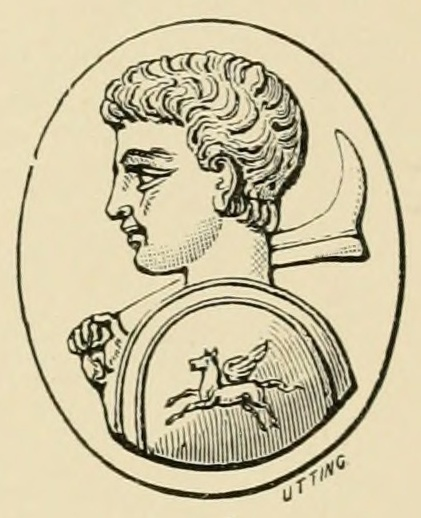
Bust of a young Caesar, probably Geta, wielding Fortune's rudder, instead of a spear. After engraved sard.

== Severan dynasty family tree ==
Severan family tree

Septimius Macer
Gaius Claudius Septimius Aper	Fulvius Pius	Lucius Septimius Severus
Publius Septimius Aper	Gaius Septimius Aper	Fulvia Pia	Publius Septimius Geta	Septimia Polla	Julius Bassianus
Septimius	Publius Septimius Geta	Septimia Octavilla	Paccia Marciana (1)	Septimius Severus (r. 193–211)	Julia Domna (2)	Julia Maesa	Gaius Julius Avitus Alexianus
Gaius Septimius Severus Aper	Fulvia Plautilla	Caracalla (r. 197–217)	Geta (r. 209–211)	Julia Soaemias	Sextus Varius Marcellus	Julia Avita Mamaea	Unknown (2)
Julia Cornelia Paula (1)	Aquilia Severa (2 and 4)	Elagabalus (r. 218–222)	Annia Faustina (3)	Sallustia Orbiana	Severus Alexander (r. 222–235)

- (1) = 1st spouse
- (2) = 2nd spouse
- (3) = 3rd spouse
- (4) = 4th spouse
- Dark green indicates an emperor of the Severan dynasty

Notes:

Except where otherwise noted, the notes below indicate that an individual's parentage is as shown in the above family tree.

Bibliography:

- Birley, Anthony R. (1999). Septimius Severus: The African Emperor. London: Routledge. ISBN 0415165911.
- Gibbon, Edward; Smith, William (1889). The Student's Gibbon: The Decline and Fall of the Roman Empire. London: Murray. OCLC 993285639.

== See also ==
- Septimia gens
- Severan dynasty family tree

Geta (emperor) Severan dynasty Born: 7 March 189 Died: December 211
Regnal titles
Preceded by Septimius Severus	Roman Emperor; 209–211; With: Septimius Severus and Caracalla	Succeeded by Caracalla
Political offices
Preceded by Lucius Fabius Cilo, Marcus Annius Flavius Libo	Roman consul 205 with Caracalla	Succeeded by M. Nummius Umbrius Primus Senecio Albinus, L. Fulvius Gavius Numisius Petronius Aemilianus
Preceded by Lucius Annius Maximus, Gaius Septimius Severus Aper	Roman consul 208 with Caracalla	Succeeded by L. Aurelius Commodus Pompeianus, Q. Hedius Lollianus Plautius Avitus
Legendary titles
Vacant Title last held by Lucius	King of Britain	Succeeded by Bassianus
