= Julia Maesa =

3rd-century Severan dynasty Roman Imperial Augusta

- Augusta
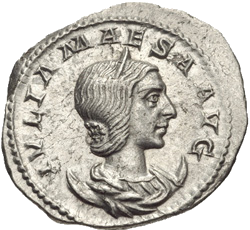
- Antoninianus of Julia Maesa
- Born: 7 May before c. 160; Emesa, Syria
- Died: After 224; Rome, Italy
- Spouse: Julius Avitus Alexianus
- Issue: Julia Soaemias; Julia Avita Mamaea
- Dynasty: Emesene and Severan
- Father: Julius Bassianus

Julia Maesa (7 May before 160 AD – c. 224 AD) was a member of the Severan dynasty of the Roman Empire who was the grandmother of emperors Elagabalus and Severus Alexander, elder sister of empress Julia Domna, and mother of Julia Soaemias and Julia Mamaea. She wielded influence during the reigns of her grandsons as Augusta of the Empire from 218 to her death, especially on their elevation to emperors.

Born in Emesa, Syria (modern day Homs), to an Arab family of priests of the deity Elagabalus, Maesa and her sister Domna were the daughters of Julius Bassianus. Through her sister's marriage, Maesa became sister-in-law to Septimius Severus and aunt of Caracalla and Geta, who all became emperors. She married fellow Syrian Julius Avitus, who was of consular rank. They had two daughters, Soaemias and Mamaea, who became mothers of Elagabalus and Severus Alexander, respectively.

As one of the Severan dynasty's prominent women, Maesa sought to return to power after her sister's suicide. She was closely involved in raising her grandson Elagabalus, and after his murder, another grandson, Severus Alexander, as emperors, which resulted in the restoration of the Severan dynasty to the Roman throne after the assassination of Caracalla and the usurpation of the throne by Macrinus. Sometime after Alexander's accession, she died in Rome. She was later deified in Syria along with her sister.

== Early life and marriage ==
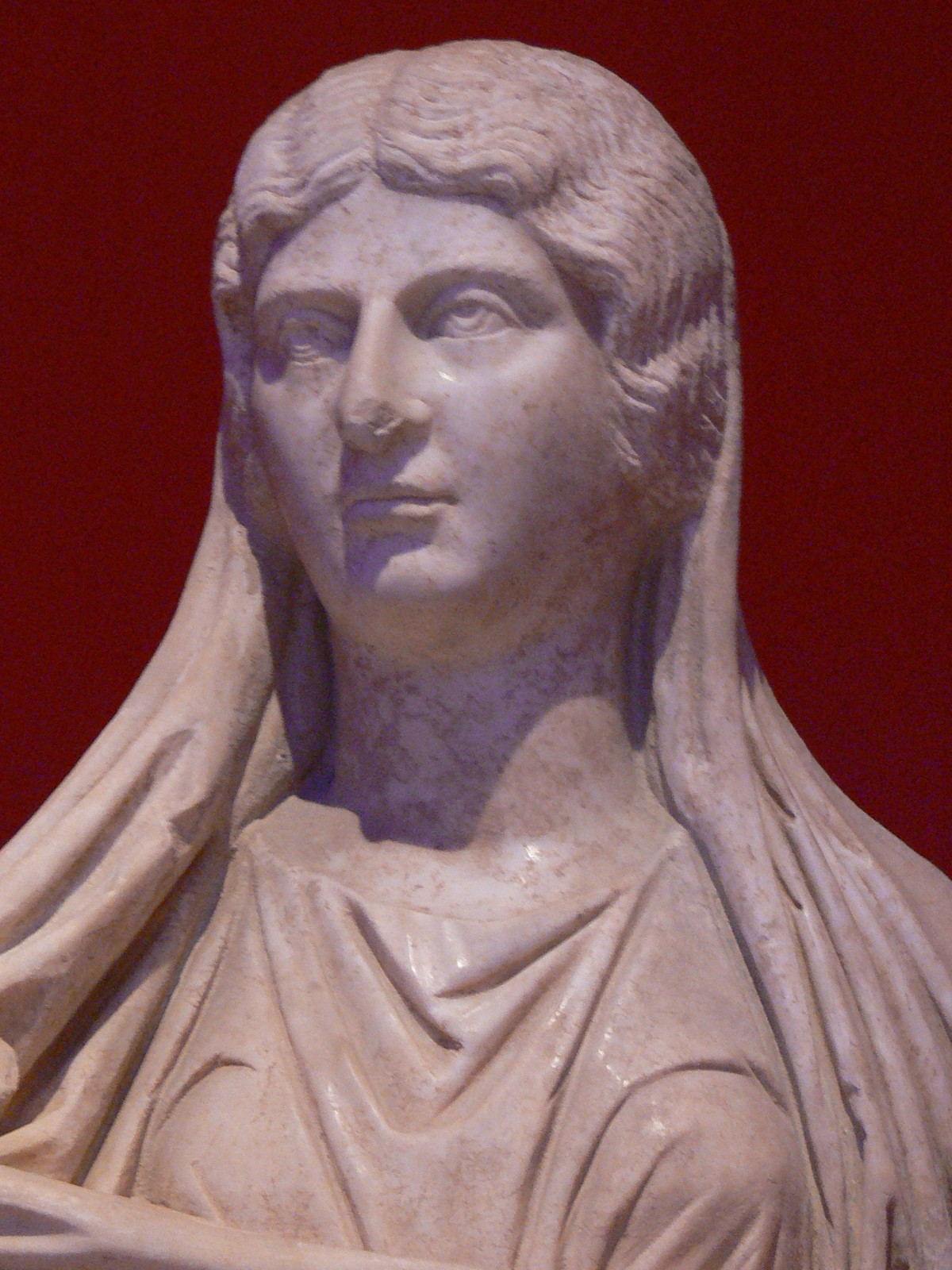
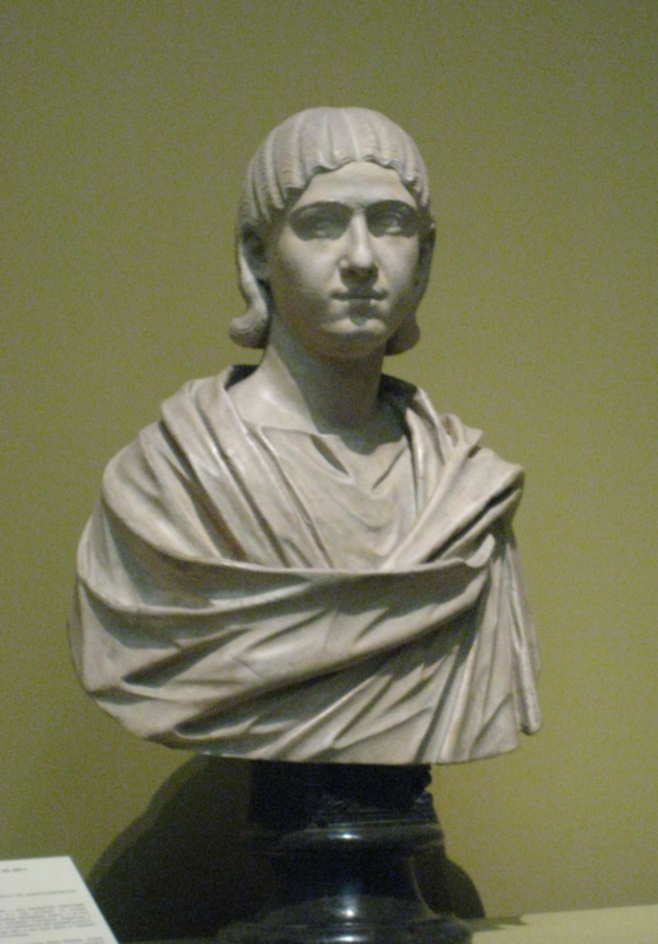
Maesa's daughters, Julia Soaemias and Julia Mamaea

Julia Maesa was born on 7 May before 160 AD, the elder daughter of the priest Julius Bassianus in Emesa, Syria, modern day Homs, as part of the Emesan dynasty. She had a younger sister, Julia Domna, who would later become Roman empress after her marriage to Septimius Severus, who was, by the time of their marriage, a senator.

As Maesa was an Arab, her cognomen, Maesa, is the feminine agent noun of the Arabic verb masa (Arabic: مايسة), which signifies walking with a swinging gait. This would be an appropriate female name, as the verb from which it was derived was used by Arab poets to describe the figures of the women they wrote about. Although no written account describing her appearance survives, her sharp and formidable features, which contradict the soft and sensitive ones of her sister, are well displayed on the coins minted during the reign of her grandchildren.

Maesa later married a fellow Syrian, Julius Avitus, a consul who also served as provincial governor in the empire. They had two daughters; her eldest daughter, Julia Soaemias, was born around 180 AD or some time before, and was followed by another daughter, Julia Mamaea, not long after.

== Life in Rome ==
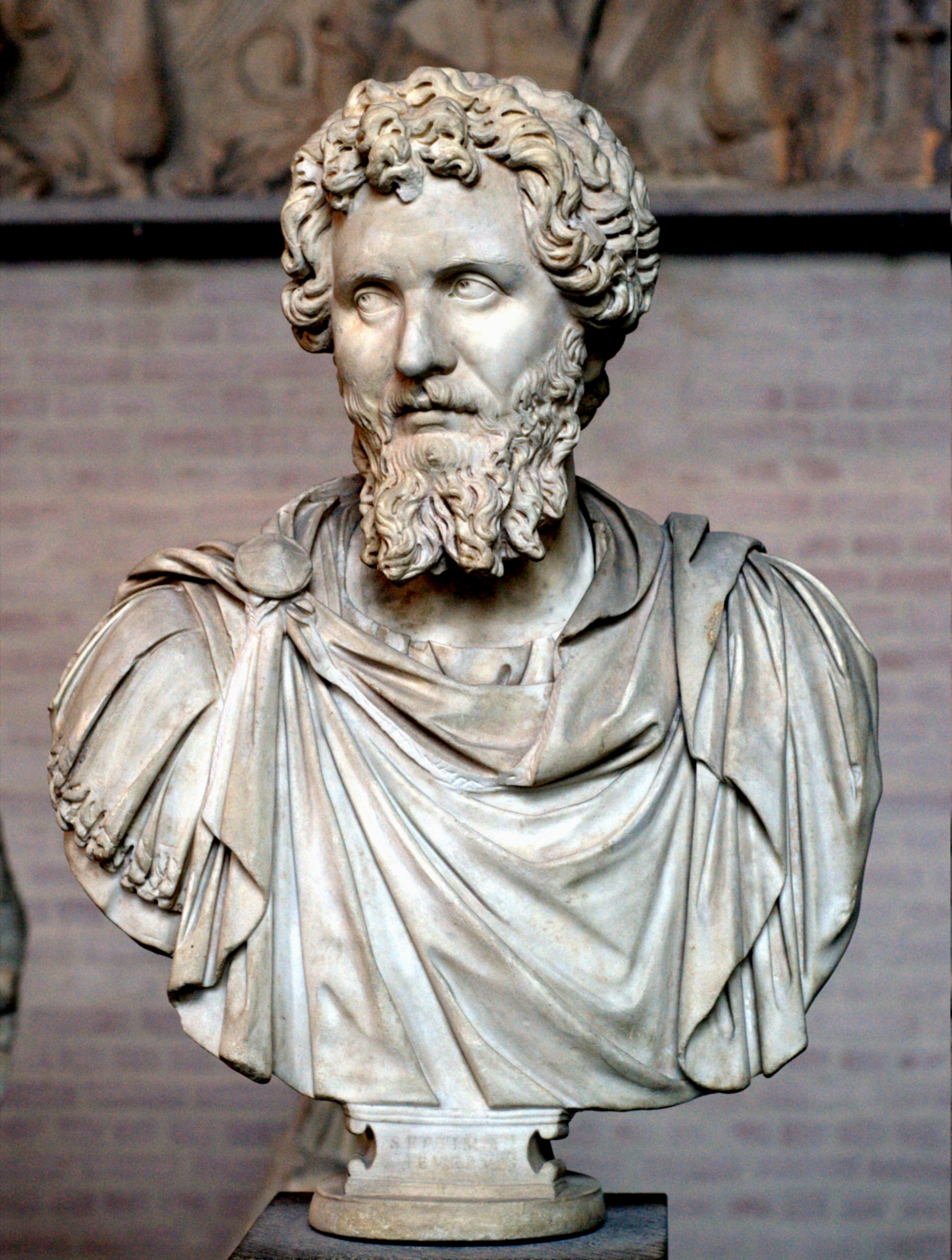
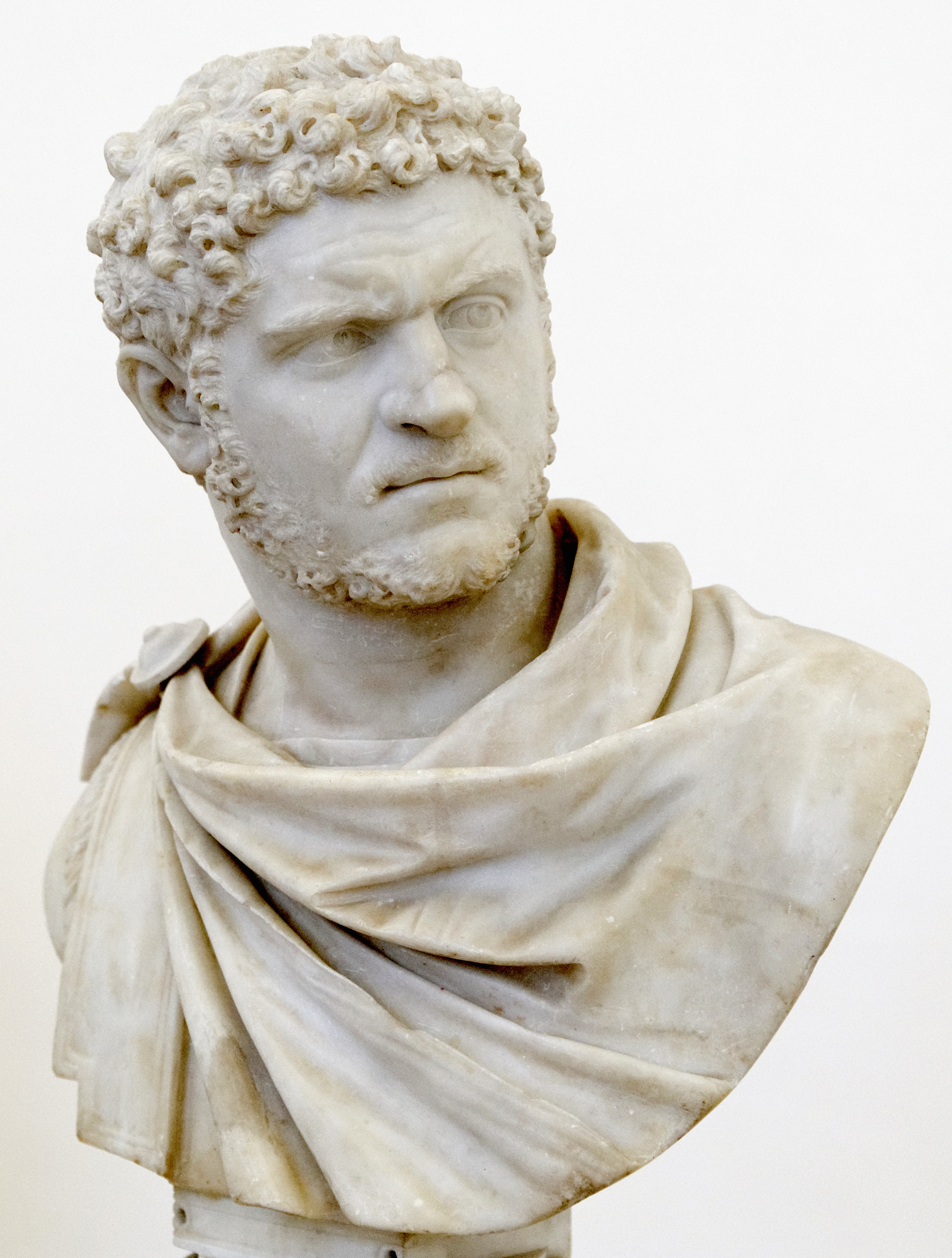
Busts of Septimius Severus (left) and Caracalla (right)

After her sister's arrival in Rome and the beginning of her tenure as empress consort, Maesa, accompanied by her family, travelled to Rome where they took up residence in the imperial court, although her husband, Julius Avitus, who held several important posts, did not stay in Rome for long and had to make many journeys across the empire; she did not accompany him on the journeys.

During their time in Rome, Maesa and her family amassed great wealth and fortune, and rose to high positions in the Roman government and court of Septimius Severus and later, his son and successor, Caracalla. Her two daughters attained prominent positions in the court while their Syrian husbands held important posts as provincial governors and consuls, with Maesa's husband, along with that of her daughter rising from the Equestrian rank to reach Senatorial rank.

=== Return to Emesa ===
In 217 AD, after the murder of emperor Caracalla and the usurpation of the throne by Macrinus, Maesa's sister Domna, now suffering from breast cancer and bereft of the power and influence she had held during the reigns of her husband and her son, having lost both of her children, chose to commit suicide by starvation.

Maesa and her family, who had resided in Rome for the last two decades, were spared and ordered by Macrinus to leave Rome and return to their home town of Emesa in Syria, likely because Macrinus wanted to avoid any action that would seem disloyal to Caracalla's memory and thus avoid any reprisals from the Roman army. Macrinus left Maesa's great wealth, amassed over a period of over twenty years, intact. Maesa arrived in Emesa some time between spring 217 and spring 218.

== Restoration of the Severan dynasty ==
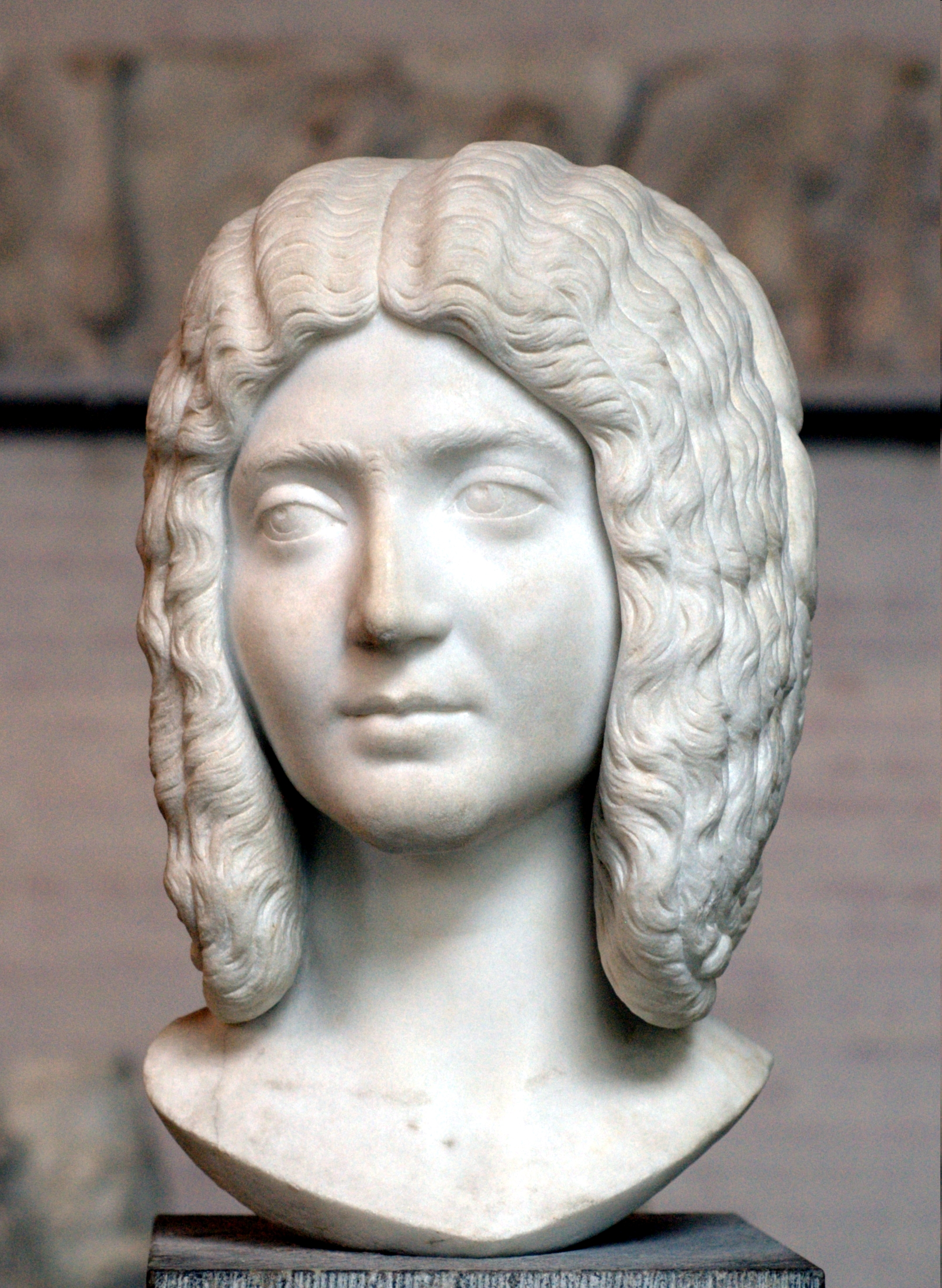
Roman empress Julia Domna, Maesa's sister, committed suicide after the murder of her son Caracalla.

Macrinus was in a difficult position after Caracalla's assassination and was struggling to gain legitimacy and maintain loyalty to his rule. This situation encouraged Maesa to act against Macrinus. Being located in Emesa, she was close to a military base where many soldiers still held the Severans in high esteem and were loyal to the dynasty. The soldiers were also discontented with Macrinus' peace with the Parthians, making Emesa an excellent location to launch a coup to restore her family to power.

Her first step was to choose a male candidate from within the family to replace the usurper, Macrinus. Maesa's husband died in Cyprus shortly before 217, as had her eldest daughter's husband. Julia Soaemias had a 14-year-old son, Varius Avitus Bassianus, who was the hereditary priest of the Emesan sun god Elagabalus. But Maesa had a different future in mind for him. He had begun attracting the soldiers of the Legio III Gallica stationed near Emesa, who would visit the city's temple occasionally to view what they considered to be the extravagant yet amusing religious rituals of Bassianus.

Maesa proceeded with her plot of trying to challenge the legitimacy of emperor Macrinus, and she did so by claiming that Bassianus, who greatly resembled Caracalla, was indeed the former emperor's bastard son and that Caracalla had slept with both her daughters. The claim that Bassianus was the love child of Caracalla and Soaemias, despite almost certainly being untrue, was not so easily refuted, as aside from the young boy's resemblance to the emperor, Soaemias had been living in the Roman court at the time of Caracalla's reign. Maesa did not seem to mind that this claim would be sacrificing the honour and reputation of her daughters.

Julia Maesa began offering to distribute her great wealth and fortune to the Roman soldiers based in Emesa in exchange for their support. This news spread throughout the army camps. Maesa, her daughter and Bassianus were taken into the army camp at night where the 14-year-old boy was immediately acknowledged and hailed as emperor by the soldiers and clad in imperial purple.

Historian Cassius Dio narrates a slightly different version of events. He mentions a certain Gannys, who is not mentioned as partaking in the plot in any other source, as the main instigator of the revolt. Allegedly a 'youth who has not yet reached manhood', Dio claims he was raised by Maesa and was Soaemias' lover and the protector of her son. On a certain night, Bassianus was dressed in clothes worn by Caracalla as a child. Without the knowledge of either Soaemias or Maesa, Gannys then took him to the army camp and claimed he was the murdered emperor's son.

It is unlikely that Maesa and Soaemias, with much to gain from Bassianus becoming emperor, would have been completely unaware of the actions of Gannys. On the other hand, it is also unlikely that Maesa alone orchestrated the young boy's ascension. In her plan she probably had the support of many important figures from the city of Emesa and even some figures in Rome's ruling elite.

=== Reaction of Macrinus ===
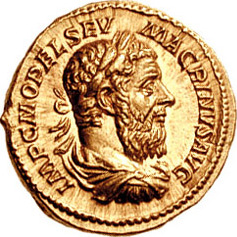
Macrinus, who usurped the Roman throne in 217 AD

With the support of an entire legion, other legionaries, prompted by discontent over pay, deserted Macrinus and joined Elagabalus' ranks as well. In response to the growing threat, Macrinus sent out a cavalry force under the command of Ulpius Julianus to try to regain control of the rebel soldiers. Rather than capturing the rebel forces, the cavalry instead killed Ulpius and defected to Elagabalus.

Following these events, Macrinus travelled to Apamea to ensure the loyalty of Legio II Parthica before setting off to march against Emesa. According to Dio, Macrinus appointed his son Diadumenian to the position of Imperator, and promised the soldiers 20,000 sesterces each, with 4,000 of these to be paid on the spot. Dio further says that Macrinus hosted a dinner for the residents of Apamea in honour of Diadumenian. At the dinner, Macrinus was supposedly presented with the head of Ulpius Julianus who had been killed by his soldiers. In response, Macrinus left Apamea and headed south.

Macrinus and Elagabalus' troops met somewhere near the border of Syria Coele and Syria Phoenice. Despite Macrinus' efforts to quell the rebellion at this engagement, his whole legion defected to Elagabalus forcing Macrinus to retire to Antioch. Elagabus took to the offensive and marched on Antioch.

==== Battle of Antioch ====
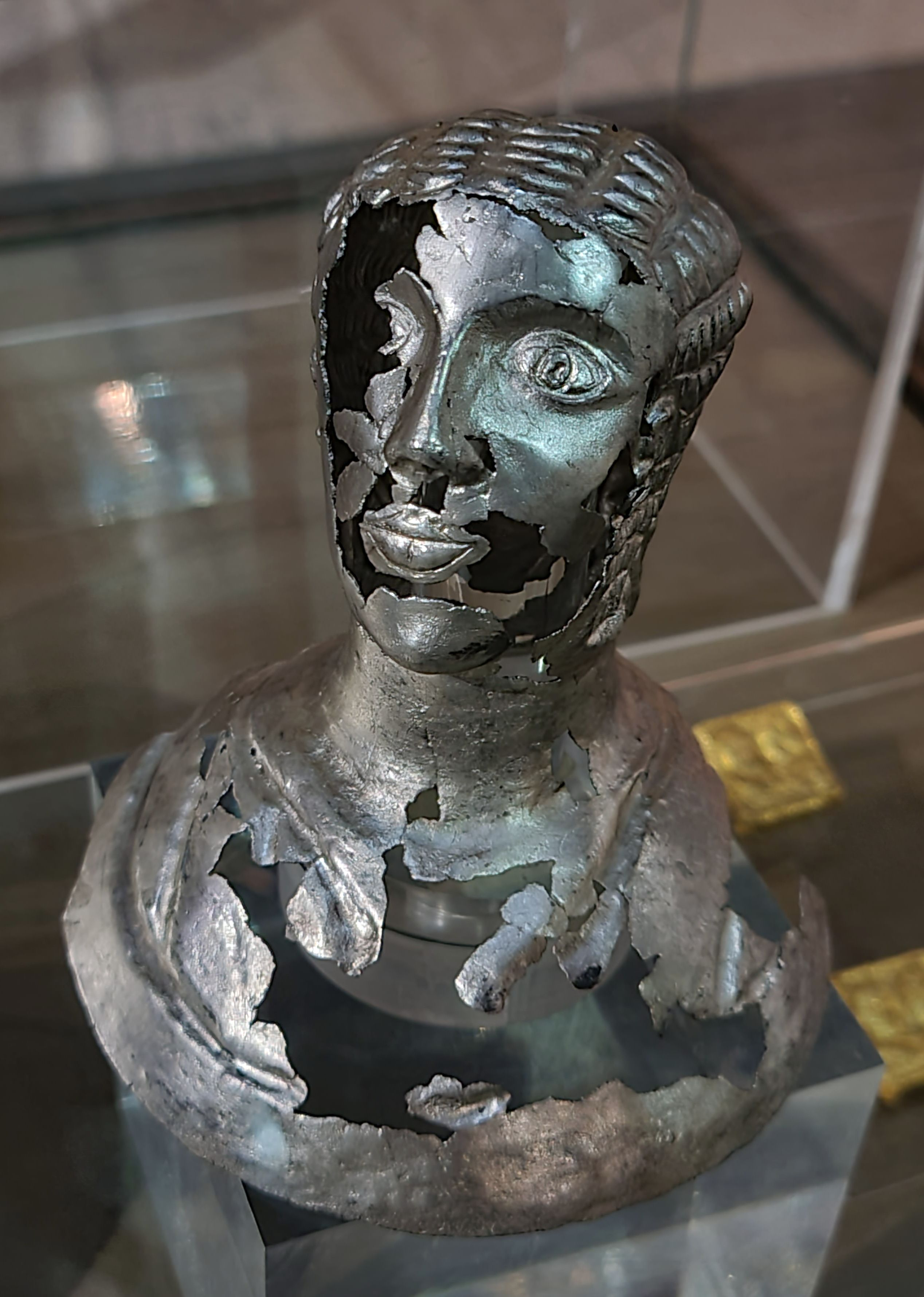
Head of Julia Meza, silver, National History Museum, Sofia

Elagabalus' armies, commanded by the inexperienced but determined Gannys, engaged Macrinus' Praetorian Guard in a pitched battle. Gannys commanded at least two full legions and held numerical superiority over the fewer levies that Macrinus had been able to raise. Macrinus had ordered the Praetorian Guard to set aside their scaled armour breastplates and grooved shields in favour of lighter oval shields prior to the battle. This made them lighter and more manoeuvrable and negated any advantage light Parthian lancers had. The Praetorian Guards broke through the lines of Gannys' force, which turned to flee. During the retreat, however, Julia Maesa and Soaemias, in a surprising act of heroism joined the fray, leaping from their chariots to rally the retreating forces, while Gannys charged on horseback headlong into the enemy. These actions effectively ended the retreat with the troops resuming the assault with renewed morale, thus turning the tide of battle. Fearing defeat, Macrinus fled back to the city of Antioch. He attempted to escape north but was captured and executed in Cappadocia, while his son Diadumenian was captured in Zeugma and executed as well.

Elagabalus entered Antioch as effectively Rome's new emperor. He stopped the soldiers from sacking the city and sent a message to the senate who were forced to accept the young boy as their new emperor. Upon ascension as emperor he took the name Marcus Aurelius Antoninus Augustus.

== Reign of Elagabalus ==
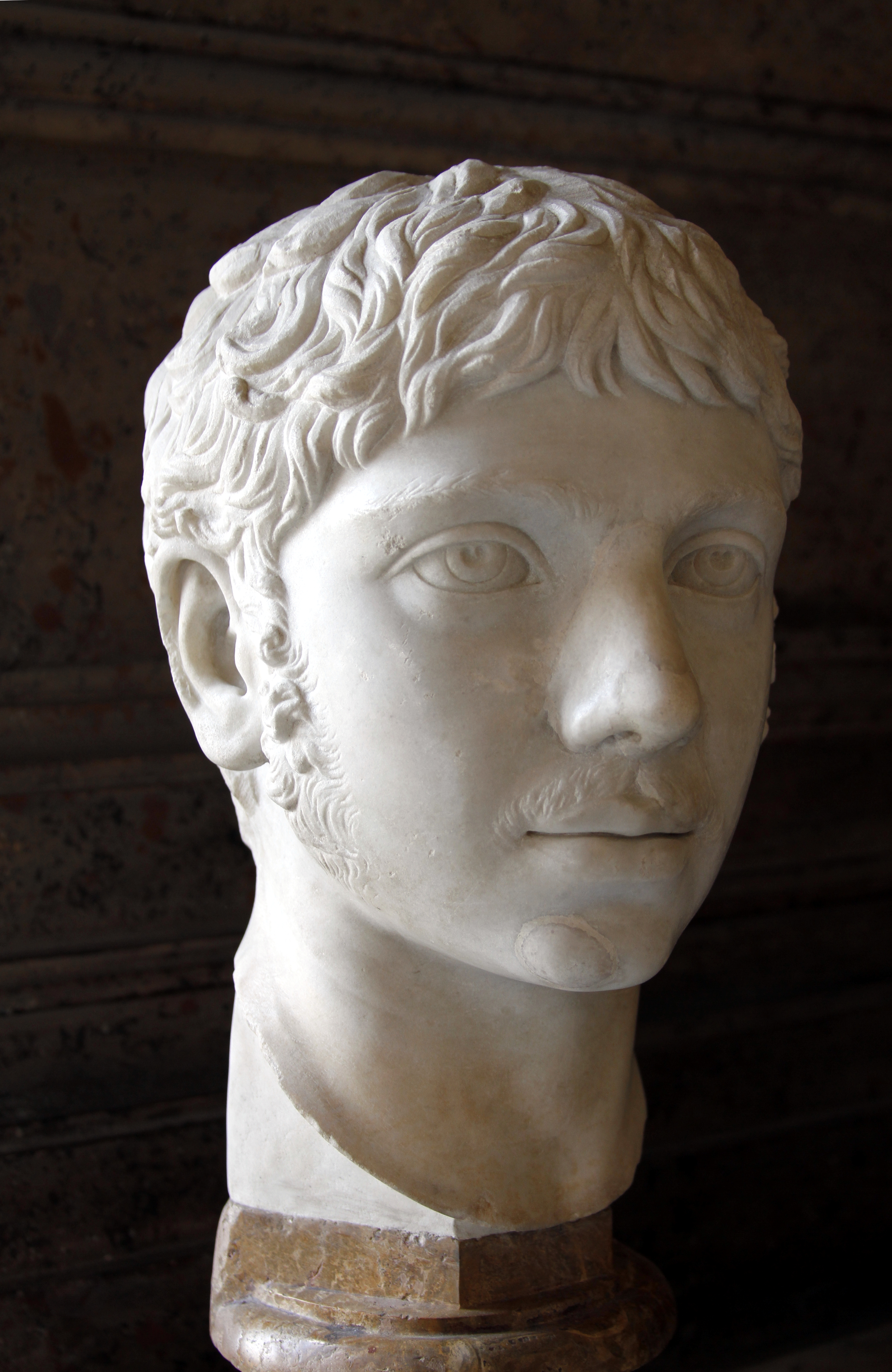
Head of Elagabalus

Although now declared emperor, Elagabalus' claim was not uncontested, as several others laid claim to the Roman throne. These included Verus, the commander of Legio III Gallica, who ironically was the first to proclaim Elagabalus as emperor, and Gellius Maximus, the commander of Legio IV Scythica. These rebellions were quashed and their instigators executed.

Elagabalus spent the winter of 218–219 in Nicomedia before he set off for Rome. Maesa allegedly urged him to enter the capital draped in Roman clothes, but instead, he had a painting of him made as a priest making offerings to the Emesene deity El-Gabal. The painting was hung right above the statue of Victoria in the senate, putting senators in the awkward position of having to make offerings to the Syrian deity whenever they wanted to make offerings to Victoria.

Both Maesa and her daughter Soaemias are featured heavily in all literary accounts of his reign, and are credited with having a significant influence over the young emperor. Julia Maesa was honoured with the titles of 'Augusta, mater castrorum et senatus' (Augusta, mother of the camp and the senate) and 'avia Augusti' (grandmother of the emperor). She and her daughter Soaemias received senatorial titles and later appeared in the Senate beside Elagabalus during his adoption of Severus Alexander, an honour previous imperial women had not received.

Soon, the young emperor lost his popularity with the praetorian guards, who did not approve of his behaviour and his unusual religious rituals. Considering how their support was crucial for his rule to survive, this was an extremely dangerous development. Julia Maesa decided to take measures to prevent things from getting too out of hand. When she opposed his move to raise his lover Hierocles to caesar, he threatened her life. However, she convinced her grandson to adopt his cousin, her grandson Alexander, and declare him caesar, with the argument that it would leave more time for Elagabalus to devote himself to religious matters. The adoption of the 12 years old Alexander provided a strategic shift for the supporters of Elagabalus, as some of the supporters felt it was no longer wise to tie their fate with that of the priest-emperor and now saw an alternative in his adopted son.

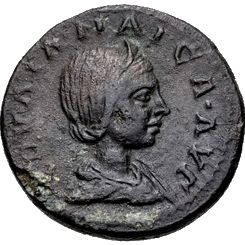
A coin of Julia Maesa from Thessalonica struck during Elagabalus' reign

Rivalry was soon increasing between the two boys and Elagabalus regretted adopting his more popular cousin. The soldiers began to look favourably upon Elagabalus' cousin, and the allies and supporters of the dynasty as well as the imperial family itself became divided, with Elagabalus and Soaemias on one side, and Mamaea, Maesa and Alexander on the other.

By the beginning of 222, Alexander and Elagabalus had become so estranged from each other that they no longer appeared together in public. An assassination attempt against Alexander by Elagabalus enraged the praetorian guards who demanded an assurance of Alexander's safety from Elagabalus and the dismissal of certain officials. Elagabalus broke his promise to do so, prompting the praetorian guard to slay Elagabalus and his mother, cutting their heads off and throwing aside their bodies. Alexander was now proclaimed emperor.

A traditionally held belief is that while Elagabalus was mainly involved in religious matters, Julia Maesa and her daughter were the ones effectively running the state. This claim has been treated with caution by contemporary historians such as Barabara Levick, as in ancient Rome, politics and religion were intertwined and the rule of Elagabalus and the supremacy of his particular deity broke this relationship. In any case it is certain that Maesa had influence over the young boy, but Elagabalus' disagreements and dismissal of Maesa's advice, who was an advocate of Roman traditionalism, can be seen as the primary cause of his downfall.

Julia Maesa may have been involved in the assassination of her daughter and grandson by conspiring with the praetorian guards, or at least she tolerated it. However, it may have helped her to retain her family's grip on power and preserve the empire's stability.

== Reign of Severus Alexander ==
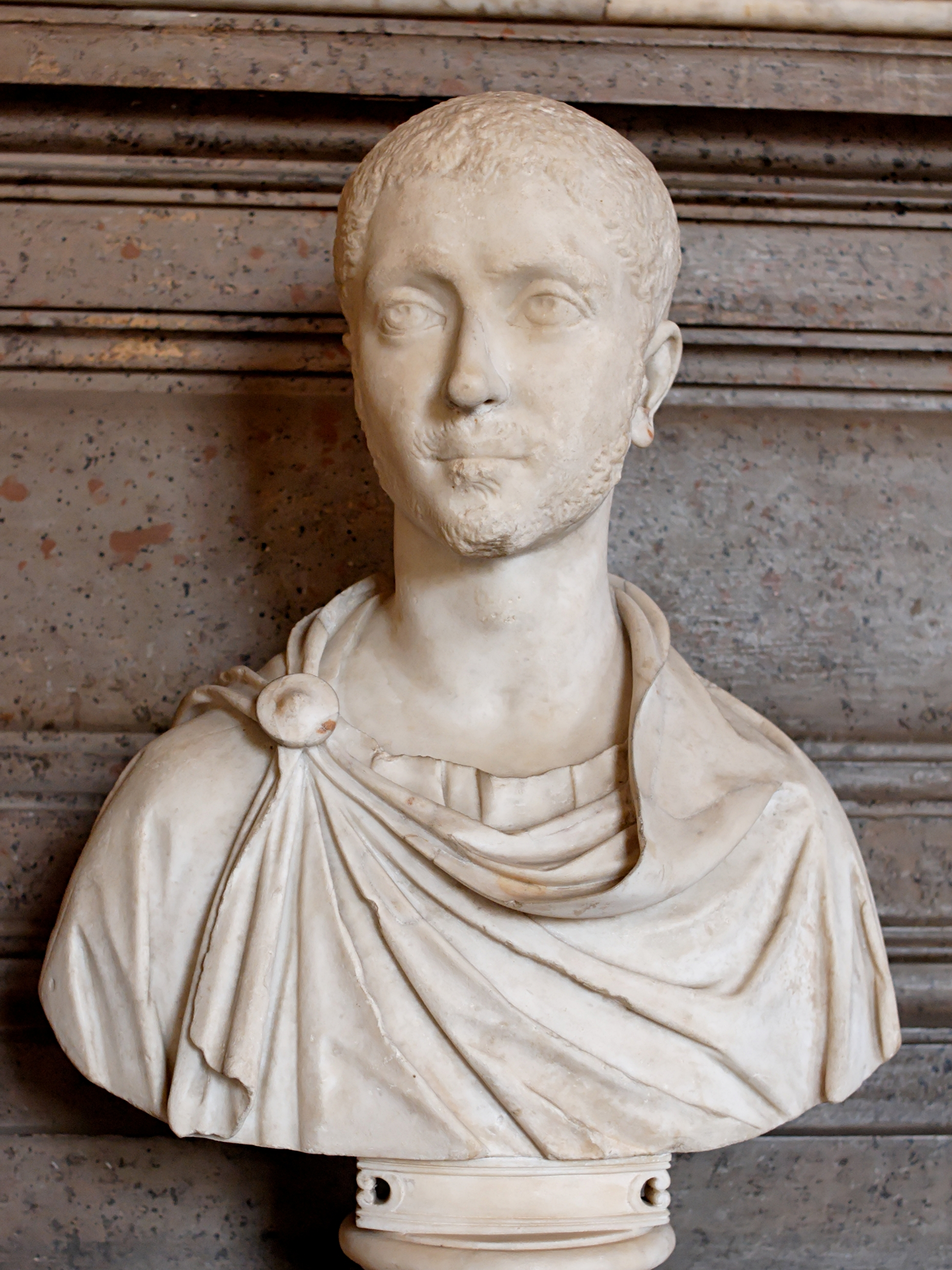
Bust of Severus Alexander

Alexander ascended the throne at the age of around 14, and he was kept in check by his mother and grandmother who were determined to erase the negative impression left by Elagabalus' rule. Alexander was given the name Marcus Aurelius Severus Alexander to emphasize his relationship to Septimius Severus, the founder of the dynasty.

Julia Mamaea and Julia Maesa also helped guide the smooth running of the empire in Alexander's minority. The inscriptions carrying the emperor's name referred to him as Juliae Mamaeae Aug(ustae) filio Juliae Maesae Aug(ustae) nepote (the son of Julia Mamaea and grandson of Julia Maesa), showing their status. The changes introduced by Maesa and her daughter included selecting a council of sixteen chosen for their moderation and experience to control the affairs of the administration and provide advice to the young emperor, restoring an aristocratic and non-tyrannical form of government. Under the new regime, new measures reversing Elagabalus' policies were introduced. The eastern religious practices introduced by the former emperor were eradicated in Rome and his religious edicts were reversed, the sacred stone of El-Gabal was returned to Emesa and the vast temple which had been dedicated to him by Elagabalus was re-dedicated to Jupiter.

== Death ==
Maesa likely died between November 224 and 227. Her death deprived her daughter, Julia Mamaea, not only of a mother but also of a political mentor and colleague, and Julia Mamaea was now alone in her family in guiding her son's rule.

=== Deification ===
Like her sister Julia Domna, Julia Maesa was deified. In the Feriale Duranum, the list of religious observances of the Cohors XX Palmyrenorum, dating to c. 227 AD, Maesa is subject to a supplication on her birthday (7 May). Coins commemorating her deification show her borne aloft on the back of a peacock. The coins are undated, but she also appears deified on the Acta Fratrum Arvalium of 7 November 224, which lists the number of gods and goddesses the Arval Brethren made sacrifices to on that certain date.

== Severan dynasty family tree ==
Severan family tree

Septimius Macer
Gaius Claudius Septimius Aper	Fulvius Pius	Lucius Septimius Severus
Publius Septimius Aper	Gaius Septimius Aper	Fulvia Pia	Publius Septimius Geta	Septimia Polla	Julius Bassianus
Septimius	Publius Septimius Geta	Septimia Octavilla	Paccia Marciana (1)	Septimius Severus (r. 193–211)	Julia Domna (2)	Julia Maesa	Gaius Julius Avitus Alexianus
Gaius Septimius Severus Aper	Fulvia Plautilla	Caracalla (r. 197–217)	Geta (r. 209–211)	Julia Soaemias	Sextus Varius Marcellus	Julia Avita Mamaea	Unknown (2)
Julia Cornelia Paula (1)	Aquilia Severa (2 and 4)	Elagabalus (r. 218–222)	Annia Faustina (3)	Sallustia Orbiana	Severus Alexander (r. 222–235)

- (1) = 1st spouse
- (2) = 2nd spouse
- (3) = 3rd spouse
- (4) = 4th spouse
- Dark green indicates an emperor of the Severan dynasty

Notes:

Except where otherwise noted, the notes below indicate that an individual's parentage is as shown in the above family tree.

Bibliography:

- Birley, Anthony R. (1999). Septimius Severus: The African Emperor. London: Routledge. ISBN 0415165911.
- Gibbon, Edward; Smith, William (1889). The Student's Gibbon: The Decline and Fall of the Roman Empire. London: Murray. OCLC 993285639.

== See also ==
- Emesan dynasty
- Julia Domna
- Elagabalus
