= Sampsiceramus I =

Priest King of Emesa

Sampsiceramus I (Imperial Aramaic: 𐡔𐡌𐡔𐡂𐡓𐡌, romanized: Šamšigeram; died 48 BC) (Note: According to authors, the name 'Sampsiceramus' might mean "The sun had established", or "The sun has decided".) was the founding Priest-King of the Emesene dynasty who lived in the 1st century BC and was a tribal chieftain or Phylarch.

== Biography ==
The ancestors of Sampsiceramus were Arabs, who settled in the Orontes Valley, and south of the Apamea region. Sampsiceramus I, his family and his ancestors in Syria had lived under the Greek rule of the Seleucid Empire. Sampsiceramus I was a son of Aziz (Azizus, c. 94 BC); paternal grandson of Iamblichus (c. 151 BC) and there was a possibility he may have had a brother called Ptolemaeus (c. 41 BC).

Sampsiceramus I was an ally to the last Seleucid Greek Monarchs of Syria. By this time, the Seleucid Empire had become very weak and always appealed to the Roman Republic to help solve political or succession problems. Around 64 BC, the Roman General and Triumvir, Pompey had reorganised Syria and the surrounding countries into Roman provinces. Pompey had installed client kings in the region, who would become allies of Rome. Among these was Sampsiceramus I. At the request of Pompey, Sampsiceramus I captured and killed in 64 BC, the second last Seleucid King Antiochus XIII Asiaticus. After the death of the latter, Sampsiceramus I was confirmed in power and his family was left to rule the surrounding region under Roman suzerainty. Client rulers such as Sampsiceramus I could police routes and preserve the integrity of Rome without cost to Roman manpower or to the Roman treasury; they were probably paid for the privilege.

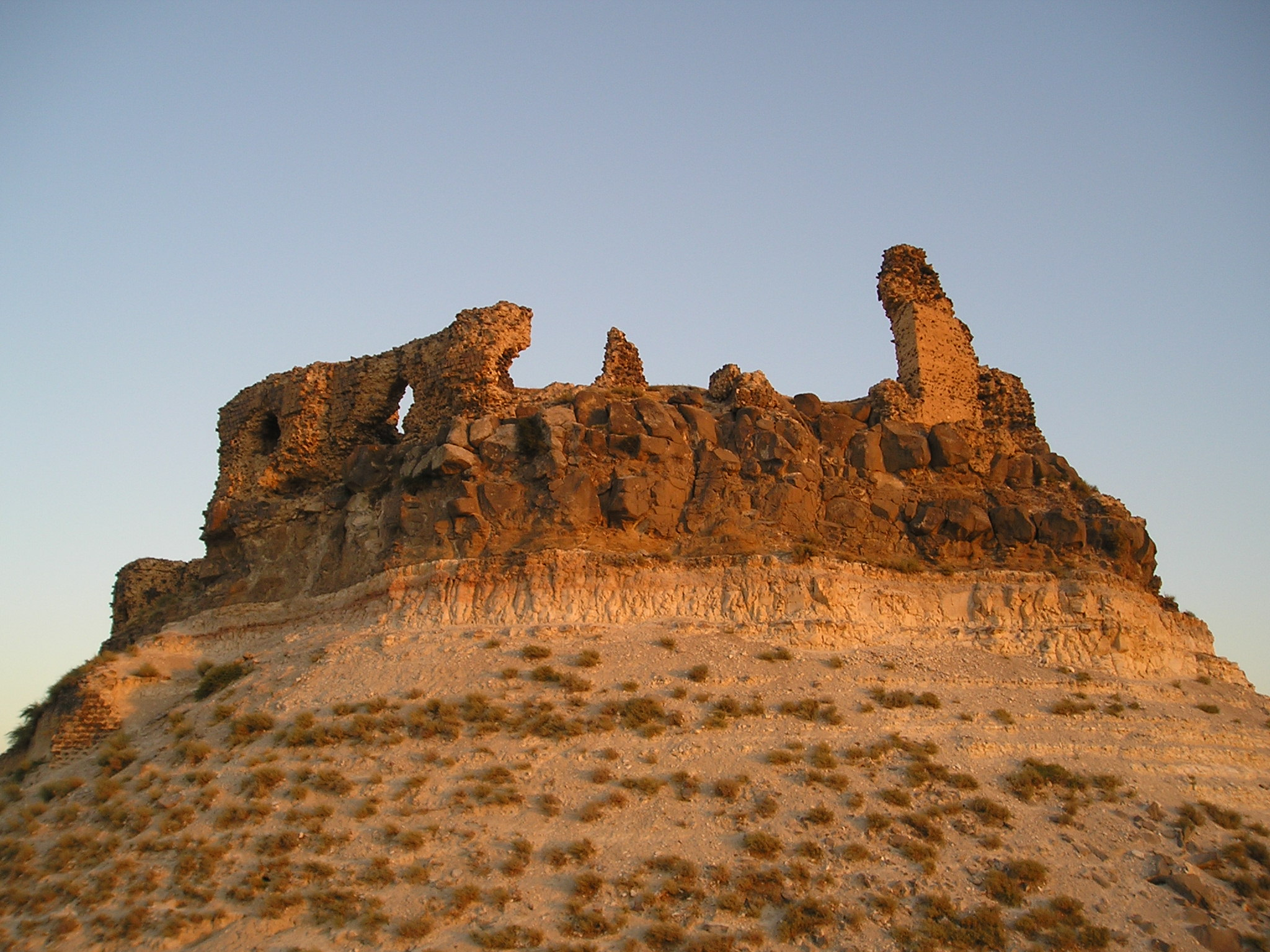
Shmemis castle, built by Sampsiceramus I

Emesa was added to the domains of Sampsiceramus I, but the first Emesene capital was Arethusa, a city north of Emesa, along the Orontes River. The kingdom of Sampsiceramus I was the first of Rome's client kingdoms on the desert's fringes. The kingdom's boundaries extended from the Beqaa Valley in the West to the border of Palmyra in the East, from Yabrud in the South to Arethusa in the North and Heliopolis. During his reign, Sampsiceramus I built a castle at Shmemis on top of an extinct volcano and rebuilt the city of Salamiyah which the Romans incorporated in the ruled territory. In time, Sampsiceramus I established and formed a powerful ruling dynasty and a leading kingdom in the Roman East. His Priest-King dynasty ruled from 64 BC until at least 254. When Sampsiceramus I died in 48 BC, he was succeeded by son, Iamblichus I. In his reign, the prominence of Emesa grew after Iamblichus I established it as the new capital of the Emesene dynasty.

== Sources ==
- Ball, Warwick (2000). Rome in the East: The Transformation of an Empire. Routledge. ISBN 9780415113762.
- Birley, A. R. (2002). Septimius Severus: The African Emperor. Routledge.
- Füchslin, Regina; Semenzato, Camille; Horn, Christoph; Wyrwa, Dietmar (2017). Christoph Riedweg (ed.). Philosophia in der Konkurrenz von Schulen, Wissenschaften und Religionen: zur Pluralisierung des Philosophiebegriffs in Kaiserzeit und Spätantike. De Gruyter. ISBN 9781501505249.
- Levick, B. (2007). Julia Domna, Syrian Empress. Taylor & Francis.
- Perowne, Stewart (1992). Caesars and Saints: The Rise of the Christian State AD 180–313. Barnes & Noble Books. ISBN 9780880299107.
