= Shmemis =

- Salamiyah, Hama Governorate, Syria
- A full view of Shmemis (spring 1995)

Location
- Coordinates: 35.0368°N 37.013508°E

Shmemis (Arabic: قلعة شميميس) also ash-Shmemis, ash-Shmamis) is a castle located in Syria. It is located 3 km north west of Salamiyah and 30 km south east from Hama.

== History ==
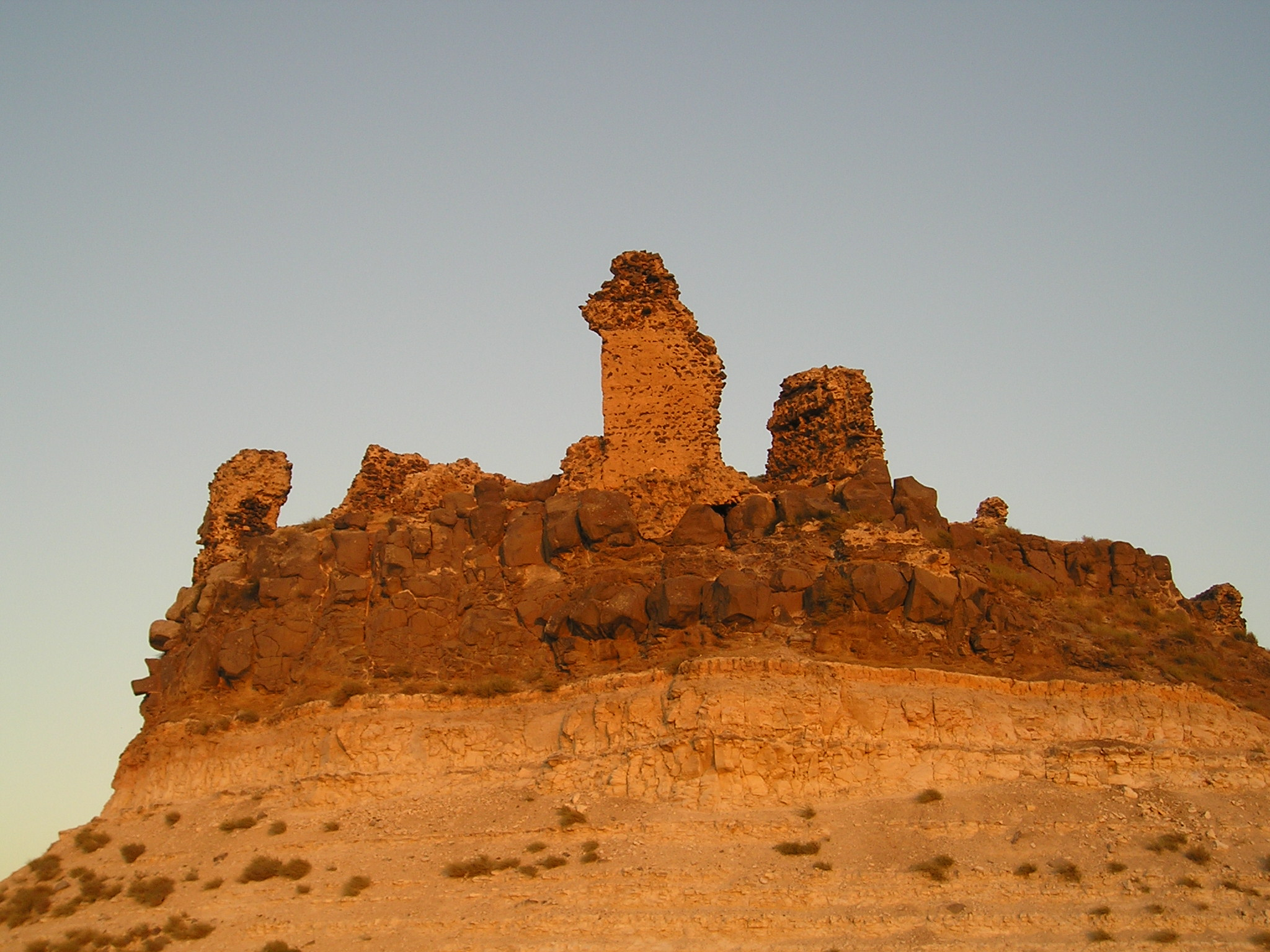
A view of Shmemis castle at sunset

The castle (Qal'at Shmamis) was first built, on top of an extinct volcano, in the 1st century BC by Sampsiceramus I, the first Priest King of the Royal family of Emesa. Most of the original structure was subsequently destroyed by an earthquake. It was later destroyed by the Persian king Khosrau II in AD 613. It was rebuilt by Assad ud-Din Shirkoh, an Ayyubid governor of Homs; the date of this reconstruction was set by Abu Fida in 626 AH (AD 1228), while Muhammad Kurd Ali in his book "al-Sham Plans" fixed it at 627 AH (AD 1229). However, the Mongols destroyed it in AD 1260, and then it was attacked again by the Tatars in AD 1401. It was rebuilt after the expulsion of the Mongols and Tatars from Syria. The castle today is in ruins with only partially preserved walls.

This castle was built on a basaltic layer covering a conical top of the mountain. This summit is surrounded by a moat 15 m depth, and provides a very deep well to meet the water needs for the castle, and another well for supplies. The walls of the latter well were covered with a layer of lime and sludge. The castle housed the royal palace, as well as foundations for housing soldiers. The importance of this castle is due to its location which allows to observe a circular area of more than 50 km in diameter.

== See also ==
- List of castles in Syria
