= Elagabalus (deity) =

Near Eastern sun god

Elagabalus (/ˌɛləˈɡæbələs/), Aelagabalus, Heliogabalus (/ˌhiːliəˈɡæbələs/) or simply Elagabal (Aramaic: 𐡀𐡋𐡄𐡀𐡂𐡁𐡋 ʾĕlāhaʾgabāl) was an Arab-Roman sun god, initially venerated in Emesa (modern-day Homs), Syria. Although there were many variations of the name, the god was consistently referred to as Elagabalus in Roman coins and inscriptions from AD 218 on, during the reign of Emperor Elagabalus.

== Cult ==
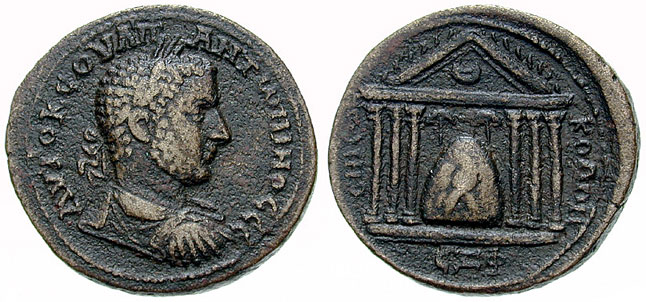
The temple at Emesa, containing the holy stone (baetyl), on the reverse of this provincial bronze coin by Roman usurper Uranius (253–254 AD)

Elagabalus was initially venerated at Emesa in Syria, where the Arab Emesan dynasty acted as its priests. The name is the Latinised form of the Arabic Ilah al-Jabal (إله الجبل), the Emesene manifestation of the deity, which is Arabic for 'God of the Mountain'. The deity successfully preserved Arab characteristics, both in his names and representations.

The cult of the deity spread to other parts of the Roman Empire in the second century, where he would be revered as Elagábalos (Ἐλαγάβαλος) by the Greeks and Elagabalus by the Romans. For example, a dedication has been found as far away as Woerden, in the modern-day Netherlands.

== In Rome ==
The cult stone or baetyl was taken to Rome by the Emperor Elagabalus, who, before his accession, was the hereditary high priest at Emesa and was commonly called Elagabalus after the deity. The Syrian deity was assimilated with the Roman sun god known as Sol and became known as Sol Invictus ('the unconquered Sun') among the Romans.

A temple called the Elagabalium was built on the east face of the Palatine Hill to house the holy stone of the Emesa temple, a black conical meteorite. Herodian writes of that stone:

This stone is worshipped as though it were sent from heaven; on it there are some small projecting pieces and markings that are pointed out, which the people would like to believe are a rough picture of the sun, because this is how they see them.

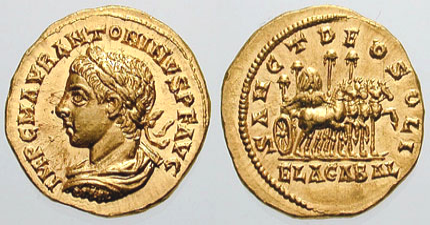
Roman aureus showing Elagabalus (struck 218–219 AD, Antioch mint). The reverse reads Sanct Deo Soli Elagabal ('To the Holy Sun God Elagabal'), and depicts a four-horse, gold chariot carrying the holy stone of the Emesa temple.

Herodian also related that Elagabalus forced senators to watch while he danced around his deity's altar to the sound of drums and cymbals, and at each summer solstice celebrated a great festival, popular with the masses because of food distributions, during which he placed the holy stone on a chariot adorned with gold and jewels, which he paraded through the city:

A six horse chariot carried the divinity, the horses huge and flawlessly white, with expensive gold fittings and rich ornaments. No one held the reins, and no one rode in the chariot; the vehicle was escorted as if the god himself were the charioteer. Elagabalus ran backward in front of the chariot, facing the god and holding the horses' reins. He made the whole journey in this reverse fashion, looking up into the face of his god.

Herodian's description strongly suggests that the Emesene cult was inspired by the Babylonian Akitu-festival.

According to Cassius Dio, the Emperor also tried to bring about a union of Roman and Syrian religion under the supremacy of his deity, which he placed even above Jupiter, and to which he assigned either Astarte, Minerva or Urania, or some combination of the three, as wife. The most sacred relics from the Roman religion were transferred from their respective shrines to the Elagabalium, including "the emblem of the Great Mother, the fire of Vesta, the Palladium, the shields of the Salii, and all that the Romans held sacred". He reportedly also declared that Jews, Samaritans and Christians must transfer their rites to his temple so that it "might include the mysteries of every form of worship".

According to Herodian, after the emperor was killed in 222, his religious edicts were reversed and the cult of Elagabalus returned to Emesa.

== See also ==
- Black Stone
- Elagabalium (temple)
- Homs
- Hubal
- Royal family of Emesa
