= Gaius Julius Alexion =

1st century Roman Client Priest King of Emesa

- Priest King of Emesa

Priest King of Emesa
- Reign: 73 - 78
- Predecessor: Sohaemus of Emesa
- Born: After 56; Arethusa, Roman Syria (possibly)
- Died: 78; Emesa, Roman Syria
- Issue: Gaius Julius Sampsigeramus (debated)
- Dynasty: Emesene dynasty
- Father: Sohaemus of Emesa
- Mother: Drusilla of Mauretania (possibly)

Gaius Julius Alexion (Greek: Γάϊος Ἰούλιος Άλεξίων, after 56 - 78) was a Syrian Prince and Roman Client Priest King of Emesa. He was the son of Syrian king Sohaemus and may have been a descendant of Egyptian queen Cleopatra VII from his maternal side.

== Family ==
Alexion was born to Sohaemus of Emesa, an Emesene Prince who ruled as Priest King from 54 until his death in 73. He was the second son of the previous ruling Emesene Monarchs Sampsiceramus II and his wife Iotapa. Alexion's late paternal uncle was the childless Emesene King Gaius Julius Azizus who was the first husband of the Herodian Princess Drusilla, while he had two paternal aunts, Iotapa who married the Herodian Prince Aristobulus Minor and Mamaea.

Alexion's mother could be a princess from Mauretania, North Africa, Drusilla, a descendant of hellenistic pharaoh Cleopatra VII of Ptolemaic Egypt and Roman triumvir Mark Antony. Drusilla's parents are presumed to be Cleopatra's and Antony's grandson, Ptolemy of Mauretania, and his wife Julia Urania, herself a possible member of Emesan royal family.

The name Alexion is a variant of the ancient Greek name Alexander. The name Alexander was a dynastic name in the Emesani Royal Family; the Seleucid dynasty; the Ptolemaic dynasty and perhaps Alexion's parents named him an intent to recover their heritage and connections to Alexander the Great. Alexion was a descendant of the Seleucid dynasty; the Ptolemaic dynasty and a distant relative of Alexander the Great through his paternal grandmother and maternal grandfather.

== Life ==
Alexion was born and raised in Emesa. After his father died, Alexion succeeded his father as Priest King of Emesa. Alexion ruled as a Priest King from 73 until his death in 78, thus he was a contemporary of the ruling Roman emperor Vespasian. He was the priest of the Emesene Sun God Elagabalus. Little is known on him. What is known about Alexion is from surviving inscriptions from Emesa.

There was a noted sepulchral Greek inscription on the mausoleum of Emesa dated 78/79 at Emesa, dedicated by Gaius Julius Sampsigeramus Seilas, who may have been related to the Sampsigeramid dynasty:

ΓΑΙΟϹΙΟΥΛΙΟϹ
ΦΑΒΙΑϹΑΜϹΙΓΕ
ΡΑΜΟϹΟΚΑΙϹΕΙΛ
ΑϹΓΑΙΟΥΙΟΥΛΙΟΥ
ΑΛΕΞΙΩΝΟϹΥΙΟϹ
ΖΩΝΕΠΟΙΗϹΕΝ
ΑΥΤΩΚΑΙΤΟΙϹΙΛ
ΟΙϹΕΤΟΥϹϞΤ

Γάϊος Ἰούλιος, Φαβίᾳ, Σαμσιγέραμος ὁ καὶ Σεί[λ]ας, Γαΐου Ἰουλίου Ἀλεξίωνος υἱός, ζῶν ἐποίησεν [ἑ]αυτῷ καὶ τοῖς ἰ[δί]οις, ἔτους ϟτʹ

Gaius Julius, Fabia, Sampsigeramus, also called Seilas, son of Gaius Julius Alexion, while still living made this for himself and his family, year 390

After the death of Alexion, the generations after him are not recorded sufficiently to accurately present a pedigree. A descendant of Alexion's is the Emesene high priest Gaius Julius Bassianus, who was the father of the Roman Empress Julia Domna and another possible descendant was the Palmyrene Queen of the 3rd century Zenobia.

Ancestors of Gaius Julius Alexion

4. Sampsiceramus II of Emesa
2. Gaius Julius Sohaemus
20. Mithridates II of Commagene
10. Mithridates III of Commagene
5. Iotapa of Emesa
22. Artavasdes I of Media Atropatene
11. Iotapa
1. Gaius Julius Alexion
24. Juba I of Numidia
12. Juba II
6. Ptolemy of Mauretania
26. Mark Antony
13. Cleopatra Selene II
27. Cleopatra VII of Egypt
3. Drusilla
7. Julia Urania

== Sources ==
- Kingdom of Commagene
- Royal Egyptian Genealogy: Ptolemaic Descendants
- Ptolemaic Genealogy - Cleopatra Selene
- Ptolemaic Genealogy - Alexander Helios
- Alexion meaning and name origin
- Chad, Carlos (1972). Les Dynastes d'Émèse (in French). Dar el-Machreq.
- Millar, Fergus (1993). The Roman Near East. Harvard University Press. ISBN 9780674778863.
- Waddington, W. H. (1870). Inscriptions grecques et latines de la Syrie (in French).
- H. Temporini & W. Haase, Aufstieg und Niedergang der römischen Welt: Geschichte und Kultur Roms im spiegel der neueren Forschung, Walter de Gruyter, 1977
- D.W. Roller, The Building Program of Herod the Great, University of California Press, 1998
- A.R. Birley, Septimius Severus: the African emperor, Routledge, 1999
- J.P. Brown, Israel and Hellas, Volume 3, Walter de Gruyter, 2001
- M. Chahin, The Kingdom of Armenia, Routledge, 2001
- B. Levick, Julia Domna, Syrian Empress, Taylor & Francis, 2007
