= Royal Family of Commagene =

Family tree of Commagene royal family

The Royal Family of Commagene ruled the ancient Greco-Iranian Kingdom of Commagene.

== Family Tree of the Royal Family of Commagene ==
Artavasdes I of Media Atropatene
Mithridates III of Commagene	Iotapa
Aka II of Commagene	Antiochus III	Iotapa of Commagene	Iotapa of Emesa	Sampsiceramus II
Antiochus IV	Julia Iotapa of Commagene	Iotapa	Aristobulus Minor
Gaius Julius Alexander	Julia Iotapa of Cetis
Gaius Julius Quadratus Bassus	Julia Iotapa

== Sources ==
- Shayegan, M. Rahim (2016). "The Arsacids and Commagene". In Curtis, Vesta Sarkhosh; Pendleton, Elizabeth J.; Alram, Michael; Daryaee, Touraj (eds.). The Parthian and Early Sasanian Empires: Adaptation and Expansion. Oxbow Books. ISBN 9781785702082.
