= Iamblichus (disambiguation) =

Iamblichus (c. 245 – 325) was a Syrian philosopher.

Iamblichus may refer to the following people of ancient Syria:

- members of the royal family of Emesa, such as:
  - Iamblichus (flourished 2nd century BC), paternal grandfather of Sampsiceramus I
  - Iamblichus (phylarch) (died 31 BC), also known as "Iamblichus I", one of the sons of Sampsiceramus I
  - Iamblichus II, son of Iamblichus I, Roman client priest king who reigned between 20 and 14 BC
- Iamblichus (novelist) (flourished 2nd century), Syrian novelist
- Iamblichus of Apameia (flourished 4th century), Syrian philosopher
- Saint Iamblichus, one of the legendary Seven Sleepers
