= Sohaemus of Emesa =

Roman Client Priest King of the Emesan kingdom (ruled AD 54-73)

Gaius Julius Sohaemus Philocaesar Philorhomaeus (Greek: Γάιος Ιούλιος Σόαιμος Φιλοκαίσαρ Φιλορωμαίος, Gaius Julius Sohaemus, lover of Caesar, lover of Rome) also known as Sohaemus of Emesa and Sohaemus of Sophene, was a prince and a Roman Client Priest King from Syria who lived in the 1st century. He ruled the Emesan kingdom from 54 until 73. His name may derive from the Arabic root SḤM, which described the color black.

== Family and early life ==
Sohaemus was a member of the Royal family of Emesa. He was the second born son and a child to Priest King Sampsiceramus II who ruled the Emesene Kingdom from 14 until 42 and Queen Iotapa. He had an elder brother called Gaius Julius Azizus, who was the first husband of the Herodian Princess Drusilla and had two sisters: Iotapa who married the Herodian Prince Aristobulus Minor and Mamaea. Sohaemus was born and raised in Emesa. His paternal grandfather was the former Emesene Priest King Iamblichus II, while his maternal grandparents were the former Commagenean monarchs Mithridates III of Commagene and his cousin-wife Iotapa.

== Reign ==
Azizus had died in 54 and Sohaemus succeeded his brother as Priest King. He ruled from 54 until his death in 73 and was the priest of the Syrian Sun God, known in Old Arabic as El-Gebal. At an unknown date in his reign, Sohaemus became the patron of the Roman colony of Heliopolis (modern Baalbek, Lebanon). In honour of his patronage of Heliopolis, a statue of Sohaemus with an accompanied honorific inscription was dedicated to him in the city. The honorary Latin inscription reads:

Regi magno C(aio) Iulio Sohaemo regis magni Sam- sigerami f(ilio), philo- caesari et philo- [r]okmaeo, honora- t[o ornamentis] consulari- b[us-------------------------------]. patrono coloniae (duum)viro quinquenn(ali) L(ucius) Vitellius L(uci) f(ilius) Fab(ia tribu) Soss[i]a[nus].

The inscription dedicates and honours, Sampsiceramus II with his son Sohaemus each as a Great King [Regis Magni]. In the inscription, Sohaemus is honoured as a duumveir quinquennalis; a Patron of the colony at Heliopolis and has been granted the ornamenta consularia [honorary consular status].

In the first year of his reign, under either Roman emperor Claudius or Nero, Sohaemus received the Roman province of Sophene to rule. As Sophene was near the source of the Tigris river, he would have been able to mount his archers to ward off the Parthians. Sohaemus might have married his relative, Princess Drusilla of Mauretania; she was the great grandchild of Ptolemaic Greek Queen Cleopatra VII of Egypt and Roman Triumvir Mark Antony, probably through their grandson, Roman client monarch Ptolemy of Mauretania, and his wife Julia Urania.

During Sohaemus’ reign, Emesene's relations with the Roman government grew closer. When Vespasian became Roman emperor in 69, Sohaemus was among the first to swear allegiance to him. Under him, Emesa sent the Roman military a regular levy of archers and assisted them in their siege of Jerusalem in 70. In 72, Sohaemus supplied troops to the Roman General Lucius Caesennius Paetus who was the head of the Legio VI Ferrata, in the annexation of the Kingdom of Commagene.

== Death and descendants ==
Sohaemus might be married to Drusilla, great-granddaughter of Cleopatra VII. His son, possibly by Drusilla, was Gaius Julius Alexio, also known as Alexio II. When Sohaemus died, he was buried in the tomb of his ancestors at Emesa and was succeeded by his son. Through his son, Sohaemus would have various descendants ruling on the Emesene throne and among those who claimed from his family's ancestry was Queen of Palmyra, Zenobia.

== Sources ==
- H. Temporini & W. Haase, 2, Principat: 9, 2, Volume 8, Walter de Gruyter, 1978
- S. Swain, Hellenism and Empire: Language, Classicism, and Power in the Greek World, Ad 50-250, Oxford University Press, 1996
- J.P. Brown, Israel and Hellas, Volume 3, Walter de Gruyter, 2001
- A.R. Birley, Septimius Severus: The African Emperor, Routledge, 2002
- B. Levick, Julia Domna, Syrian Empress, Taylor & Francis, 2007
- Kingdom of Commagene
- Royal Egyptian Genealogy, Ptolemaic Dynasty: Cleopatra Selene
