= Iotapa =

Iotapa may refer to:

== People ==
A number of relatives, part of the Royal Family of Commagene:

- (1) Iotapa (daughter of Artavasdes I) (born in 43 BC), daughter of King Artavasdes I of Media Atropatene, Queen consort of King Mithridates III of Commagene
- (2) Iotapa (spouse of Antiochus III) (born around 20 BC), a daughter of King Mithridates III of Commagene and Queen Iotapa (daughter of Artavasdes I) (1), who married her King brother Antiochus III
- (3) Iotapa (spouse of Sampsiceramus II) (born around 20 BC), another daughter of King Mithridates III of Commagene and Queen Iotapa (daughter of Artavasdes I) (1), who married Syrian king Sampsiceramus II of Emesa
- (4) Iotapa (daughter of Sampsiceramus II) (who lived in the 1st century), daughter of King Sampsiceramus II of Emesa and Queen Iotapa (spouse of Sampsiceramus II) (3), who married the Herodian Prince Aristobulus Minor
- (5) Julia Iotapa (daughter of Antiochus III) (from before 17 to about 52), daughter of King Antiochus III of Commagene and Queen Iotapa (spouse of Antiochus III) (2), who married her brother King Antiochus IV of Commagene
- (6) Julia Iotapa (daughter of Antiochus IV) (born around 45), daughter of King Antiochus IV of Commagene and Queen Julia Iotapa (daughter of Antiochus III) (5), who married Gaius Julius Alexander, son of Herodian prince Gaius Julius Tigranes, later crowned Queen of Cetis, a small region in Cilicia
- (7) Julia Iotapa (Cilician Princess) (born around 80), daughter of King Gaius Julius Alexander and Queen Julia Iotapa (daughter of Antiochus IV) (6) of Cetis, who married Gaius Julius Quadratus Bassus, Galatian Roman Senator from Anatolia

== Places ==
- Iotapa in Isauria, a town of ancient Cilicia

== See also ==
- Euttob (given name)
