= Drusilla of Mauretania =

Drusilla of Mauretania is a name sometimes used to refer to two women;

- "Julia" (possibly named Drusilla), daughter of Juba II of Mauretania
- Drusilla, descendant of Cleopatra
