= Sohaemus =

Sohaemus may refer to:

- Sohaemus of Emesa, 1st-century Roman client king
- Sohaemus of Armenia, 2nd-century Roman client king
