= Uranius =

Name of two possible 3rd century Roman imperial usurpers

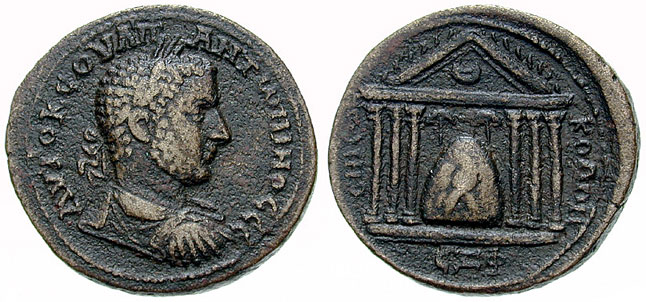
Uranius Antoninus coin, with Greek inscriptions and dated according to the Seleucid Empire. On the reverse, the Emesa temple to the sun god El Gabal, with the holy stone.

Uranius is the name of two possible Roman usurpers of the third century AD.

The first Uranius is mentioned only by Zosimus, and was briefly active during the latter part of the reign of Alexander Severus. He was chosen by dissatisfied soldiers along the Danube and from a lowly background. There is little confirmatory evidence of his existence.

A second, and better attested usurper was Lucius Julius Aurelius Sulpicius Severus Uranius Antoninus, who appears to have been active in Syria in the early 250s AD. Coins minted in Emesa have been found bearing his name, and invoking the local deity Sol Invictus. Some scholars have connected him to an Emesan priest active in this period, known as Sampsiceramus.

It is not clear whether the coins that were struck in Syria belong to the same man (or men) spoken about in the texts. If the later date is correct Uranius might have helped defend the Roman Empire against Shapur I, the Sassanid king of Persia.

What happened to him after his claim on the throne is not known.
