= Gaius Julius Sampsigeramus =

Builder of the mausoleum of Emesa (c. 78/79 AD)

Gaius Julius Sampsiceramus (Ancient Greek: Γάϊος Ἰούλιος Σαμσιγέραμος; fl. 78 or 79 AD), "from the Fabia tribe, also known as Seilas, son of Gaius Julius Alexion," was the builder of a mausoleum that formerly stood in the necropolis of Tell Abu Sabun (in modern-day Homs, Syria), as recorded on an inscription said to have belonged to the monument. His relatedness to the Sampsigeramids (the Emesene dynasty of priest-kings) has been deemed possible, probable, or has even been accepted, in which case through Gaius Julius Alexion.

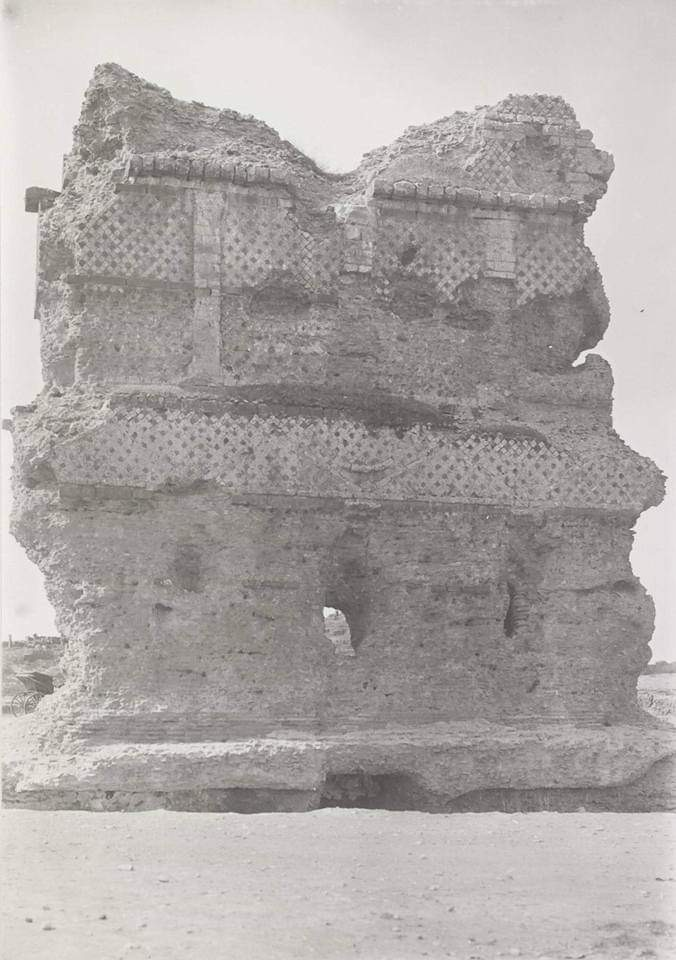
The Tomb of Sampsigeramus, photographed 1907

According to Maurice Sartre, the owner's Roman citizenship, attested by his tria nomina, strongly supports relatedness to the royal family. The lack of allusion to royal kinship is best explained if the dynasty had been deprived of its kingdom shortly before the mausoleum was built and the said kingdom had been annexed to the Roman province of Syria, which occurred very likely between 72 and the construction of the mausoleum. As worded by Andreas Kropp, "what the builder was really keen on stressing is that he was a Roman citizen bearing the tria nomina."

According to Christian Settipani, Sampsigeramus had a son named Gaius Julius Longinus Sohaemus, by whom he had a grandson, Gaius Julius Avitus, and two great-grandchildren, Julia Bassa and Sohaemus of Armenia.

== Sources ==
- Chad, Carlos (1972). Les Dynastes d'Émèse (in French).
- Jullien, M. (1893). Sinaï et Syrie (in French).
- Millar, Fergus (1993). The Roman Near East. Harvard University Press. ISBN 9780674778863.
- Settipani, Christian (2000). Continuité gentilice et continuité familiale dans les familles sénatoriales romaines à l'époque impériale (in French). Unit for Prosopographical Research, Linacre College, University of Oxford. ISBN 9781900934022.
- Kropp, Andreas (2010). "Earrings, Nefesh and Opus Reticulatum: Self-Representation of the Royal House of Emesa in the First Century AD". In Kaizer, Ted; Facella, Margherita (eds.). Kingdoms and Principalities in the Roman Near East. Franz Steiner Verlag Stuttgart.
- Sartre, Maurice (2001). D'Alexandre à Zénobie : Histoire du Levant antique (in French). Fayard. ISBN 9782213640693.
- Seyrig, Henri (1952). "Antiquités syriennes". Syria (in French). Archived from the original on 2019-05-02.
