= Euttob (given name) =

also known as Youtab (Persian: یوتاب yutâb) is an ancient and modern Persian girl's name meaning bright and unique. The Greek/Latin translation of the name is Iotapa or Jotapa, Iotape or Jotape, (Ancient Greek: Ἰωτάπη).

== People ==
- Iotapa (disambiguation)
