= Drusilla (descendant of Cleopatra) =

1st century Princess of Mauretania

Drusilla of Mauretania
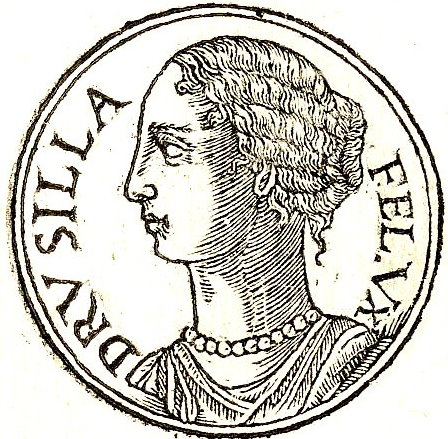
- Fictional portrait of Drusilla
- Born: probably late AD 30s Caesarea Mauretaniae (Algeria)
- Died: after AD 54
- Spouse: Antonius Felix; Unknown king (possibly Sohaemus of Emesa)
- Issue: Gaius Julius Alexion (possibly)
Names
- Drusilla
- Dynasty: Numidia (Note: Most likely, as she is presumed to be descendant of Cleopatra VII through one of Cleopatra Selene's children with Juba II.); Ptolemaic (female line)
- Father: Ptolemy of Mauretania (most likely)
- Mother: Julia Urania (?)

Drusilla (Greek: Δρουσίλλη; between AD 30-40 – after 54) was a princess of the Roman client kingdom of Mauretania in North Africa. She was a descendant of Pharaoh Cleopatra VII of Ptolemaic Egypt and Roman triumvir Mark Antony, most likely through their grandson, Ptolemy of Mauretania. She was married to the procurator Marcus Antonius Felix in the reign of Roman emperor Claudius.

== Family ==
Drusilla's lineage is not entirely clear; Tacitus calls her a granddaughter of Cleopatra and Mark Antony, which would make her a daughter of King Juba II and Queen Cleopatra Selene II of Mauretania, but the chronology of her lifespan makes it more likely that she was their great-granddaughter. Being descendant of Cleopatra VII, Drusilla was probably born to Ptolemy of Mauretania (son of Juba and Selene) and his wife, Julia Urania, as Cleopatra's sons Alexander Helios and Ptolemy Philadelphus are presumed to have died childless.

Her mother may have been a member of the Royal family of Emesa - she could be "Queen Julia Urania" who is mentioned in the funeral inscription of her freedwoman Julia Bodina at Caesaria.

== Early life ==
Drusilla was most probably born in Caesaria (modern Cherchell, Algeria), the capital of the Roman client kingdom of Mauretania. She was named in honor of Ptolemy of Mauretania's (her presumed father) second maternal cousin Julia Drusilla, one of the sisters of the Roman Emperor Caligula who died around the time of her birth.

== First marriage ==
Ptolemy of Mauretania was executed while visiting Rome in 40. Mauretania was annexed by Rome and later became two Roman provinces. Drusilla was probably raised in the Imperial Family in Rome. At an unknown point before 54 AD, most likely around 53 AD, the Roman Emperor Claudius arranged for her to marry Marcus Antonius Felix, a Greek freedman who was the Roman Governor of Judea. Before or in 54 Felix divorced Drusilla as he fell in love with and married the Herodian princess Drusilla.

Drusilla held the Latin honorary title of Regina. The Roman historian Suetonius only uses the word Regina to describe a queen regnant or a queen consort. According to Suetonius, she is one of the three queens whom Felix married. Her title may have been purely honorary; possibly it reveals Felix's influence, the high position to which Claudius had appointed him, and his quasi-royal status in the imperial court. (As explained by Tacitus, Felix and his brother Marcus Antonius Pallas were descended from the Greek kings of Arcadia.) At the time of her first marriage, Drusilla was the only daughter of a king of a former kingdom, which may explain her title; however, title most likely means she married a ruling king after her divorce from the first husband.

== Second marriage ==
Drusilla's second husband could potentially be her distant relative, the Emesene Priest King, Sohaemus, who ruled from 54 until his death in 73. Sohaemus was the Priest of the Syrian Sun God, known in Old Arabic as El-Gebal. If true, through this marriage Drusilla became Queen consort of the Roman client kingdom of Emesa. Drusilla and Sohaemus may have had a son, Gaius Julius Alexion, also known as Alexio II, who later succeeded his father as Emesene Priest King. A possible descendant of Drusilla was the Syrian queen of the 3rd century, Zenobia of Palmyra. According to some speculation she may also have been an ancestor of Julius Bassianus, father of empress Julia Domna (wife of the Roman emperor Septimius Severus and mother of emperor Caracalla) as well as Julia Maesa (maternal grandmother of the emperors Elagabalus and Severus Alexander).

Relationship of Drusilla to Sohaemus

Ptolemy V Epiphanes	Cleopatra I Syra
Ptolemy VI Philometor	Cleopatra II
Ptolemy VIII Physcon	Cleopatra III
Ptolemy IX Lathyros	Tryphaena
Ptolemy XII Auletes	Laodice VII Thea
Cleopatra	Antiochus I Theos
Cleopatra Selene II	Mithridates II	Athenais
Ptolemy of Mauretania	Mithridates III	Iotapa
Iotapa
Drusilla	Sohaemus

== Ancestors ==
Ancestors of Drusilla of Mauretania

16. Hiempsal II of Numidia
8. Juba I of Numidia
4. Juba II of Numidia
2. Ptolemy of Mauretania?
20. Marcus Antonius Creticus
10. Mark Antony
21. Julia
5. Cleopatra Selene II of Egypt
22. Ptolemy XII Auletes
11. Cleopatra VII Philopator, Queen of Egypt
23. Cleopatra V of Egypt?
1. Drusilla of Mauretania
3. Julia Urania?
