= Julius Alexander =

2nd century nobleman from the royal family of Emesa

Julius Alexander, also known as Julius Alexander of Emesa, was a prince from the royal family of Emesa who lived in the 2nd century.

Although Alexander was a nobleman from Emesa, Syria, little is known of his origins. He may have been the son of Sohaemus of Armenia also known as Gaius Julius Sohaemus, who served as a Roman client king of Armenia from 144 until 161, then again in 163 perhaps up to 186. He may have been a possible kinsman of the Roman Empress Julia Domna, which could explain him as a possible ancestor of the Roman emperor of the 3rd century Alexander Severus. Alexander and Severus share the same cognomen, Alexander. The name Alexander is a dynastic name in the Emesan dynasty.

Alexander became a Bestiarius, also known as an animal fighter. Alexander became skilled at lion-hunting. He was known to have brought down a lion with his javelin while on horseback. His prowess provoked the jealousy of the Roman emperor Commodus.

Commodus ordered Alexander to be hunted down and killed in Emesa c. 190. Alexander could have escaped from Commodus’ soldiers, but lost time because he didn't want to leave behind his youthful male lover, who was himself an excellent horseman. Alexander tried to escape the assassins together with his lover, but they were overtaken and killed.

Alexander was buried in the Emesan dynastic tomb in Emesa. Julius Alexander is mentioned in the histories of Cassius Dio and in the Historia Augusta, in The Life of Commodus.

== See also ==
- Bestiarii

== Sources ==
- A.R. Birley, Septimius Severus: The African Emperor, Routledge, 2002
- B. Levick, Julia Domna: Syrian Empress, Routledge, 2007
- L. de Arrizabalaga y Prado, The Emperor Elagabalus: Fact or Fiction?, Cambridge University Press, 2010
- Roman Emperors: Commodus
