= Emesene dynasty =

Roman client kingdom based in the Levant

Coordinates: 35°2′12.48″N 37°0′48.63″E

Emesene dynasty آل شمسيغرام Āl Shamsīghirām Sampsigeramids
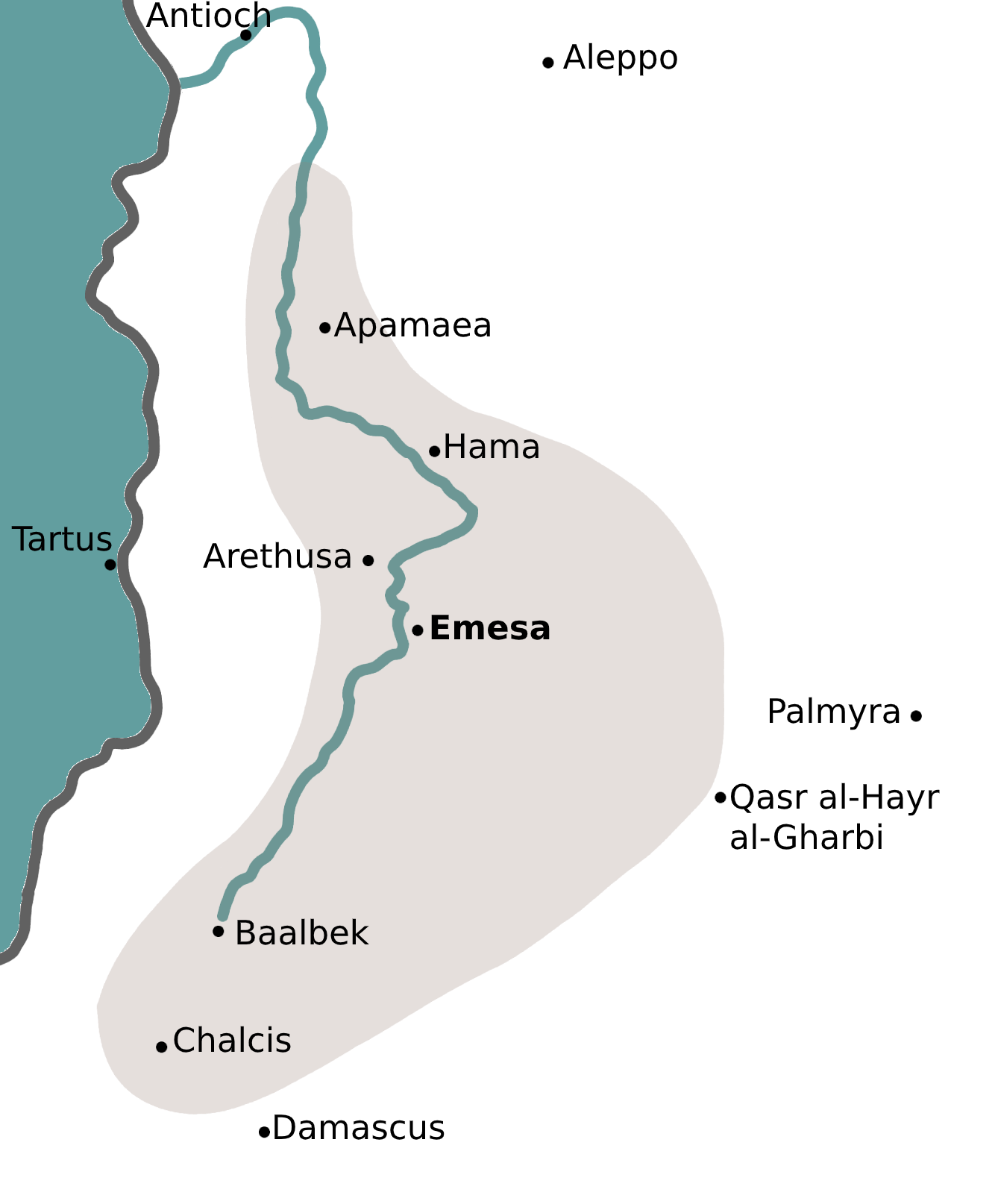
- The Kingdom of Emesa at its greatest extent
- Country: Kingdom of Emesa (Roman client kingdom)
- Founded: by 46 BC
- Founder: Sampsigeramus I
- Final ruler: likely Gaius Julius Alexion or, before him, Sohaemus of Emesa
- Titles: thought to have been priest-kings
- Traditions: cult of Elagabalus
- Deposition: as kings, likely between 72 and 78/79, at latest by 161

The Emesene (or Emesan) dynasty, also called the Sampsigeramids or the Sampsigerami or the House of Sampsigeramus (Arabic: آل شمسيغرام, romanized: ʾĀl Šamsīġirām), were a Roman client dynasty of Arab priest-kings known to have ruled by 46 BC from Arethusa and later from Emesa, Syria, until between 72 and 78/79, or at the latest the reign of Emperor Antoninus Pius (138–161). Iamblichus, the famous Neoplatonist philosopher of the third century, was one of their descendants, as was empress Julia Domna, matriarch of the Severan dynasty.

== Onomastics ==
Most modern sources declare the family to be of Arab origin. Some members of the family such as Julius Bassianus, father of Julia Domna, are described in Roman sources as "a priest of the Sun, whom the Phoenicians, from whom he sprang, call Elagabalus". Since Emesa was well outside the traditional and geographical boundaries of Phoenicia, some modern historians consider the use of "Phoenician" in these sources a pseudo-ethnic label; one that arose from the political creation of Syria Phoenice by Septimius Severus in 194.

Some authors believe that Kings Sampsigeramus and Iamblichus had Aramaic names, while other historians believe their names are Arabic. The name Samsigeramus is derived from Shams, meaning sun; while geram is related to the Arabic root k-r-m, meaning "to venerate". Other kings, such as Azizus and Sohaemus, had clearly Arabic names. Iamblichus was referred to as "Phylarch of the Arabs" by Cicero and "King of an Arabian tribe" by Cassius Dio. It is said that Emesa and its surrounding had a strong presence of Arabic-speaking people at the time, although the ancient name of the city appears to be Aramaic.

In Emesa, Aramaic and Greek were commonly spoken languages and, during the Roman Empire, Latin was probably commonly spoken in the city.

== Religion ==
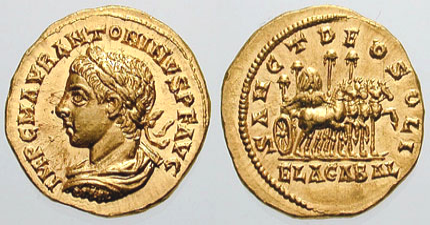
3rd-century Roman aureus depicting Elagabalus. The reverse reads Sanct Deo Soli Elagabal (To the Holy Sun God Elagabal), and depicts a four-horse, gold chariot carrying the holy stone of the Emesa temple.

Emesa was recorded by Herodian (Note: in History of the Empire from the Death of Marcus (5.4)) to have been by the 3rd century the centre of a worship of the ancient pagan god Elagabalus, the original name of which is posited to have been El-Gabal, Elah Gabal or Ilah Gabal (Modern Arabic "إله جبل"), meaning "God of the Mountain". In Emesa, the religious "lord", or Ba'al, was the cult of Elagabalus. (Note: Herodian further describes the Temple of Emesa in the early third century (5.4): it was the renowned place of worship of Elagabalus in the form of a conical black stone. The priesthood of the cult of El-Gebal in Emesa was held by a family (that may be assumed to be descended from Sampsiceramus I or the later Priest-King Sohaemus, either by the Priest-King or another member of the dynasty). Each year neighbourhood princes and rulers sent generous gifts honoring and celebrating Emesa's cult and its Temple of the Sun. The priest that served in the cult of El-Gebal wore a clad costume. The dress of an Emesene Priest was very similar to the dress of a Parthian Priest. An Emesene priest wore a long-sleeved and gold-embroidered purple tunic reaching to his feet, gold and purple trousers and a jewelled diadem on his head.) This cult is assumed to have existed already at the time when the dynasty was still ruling (it is believed, as priest-kings), although there might have been originally two separate cults. The deity Elagabalus successfully preserved Arab characteristics both in his names, and in his representations.

== History ==
=== Sampsiceramus I to Sampsiceramus II ===
Sampsiceramus I (Imperial Aramaic: 𐡔𐡌𐡔𐡂𐡓𐡌, romanized: Šmešgram) was the founding Priest-King of the Emesene dynasty who lived in the 1st century BC and was a tribal chieftain or Phylarch. The ancestors of Sampsiceramus I were Arabs who had travelled the Syrian terrain, before deciding to settle in the Orontes Valley and South of the Apamea region. Sampsiceramus I, his family and his ancestors in Syria had lived under the Greek rule of the Seleucid Empire. Sampsiceramus I was a son of Aziz (Azizus, c. 94 BC); paternal grandson of Iamblichus (c. 151 BC) and there was a possibility he may have had a brother called Ptolemaeus (c. 41 BC) who may have had descendants through his son. Through the rule and influence of the Seleucid dynasty and Greek settlement in the Seleucid Empire, the area was assimilated into the Greek language and culture of the Hellenistic period. Hence, Sampsiceramus I and his ancestors became Hellenized through the Greek rule of Syria and the surrounding territories.

Sampsiceramus I was an ally to the last Seleucid Greek Monarchs of Syria. By this time, the Seleucid Empire had become very weak and always appealed to the Roman Republic to help solve political or succession problems. Around 64 BC, the Roman General and Triumvir, Pompey had reorganised Syria and the surrounding countries into Roman provinces. Pompey had installed client kings in the region, who would become allies of Rome. Among these was Sampsiceramus I (whose name is also spelt Sampsigeramus). The Roman politician Marcus Tullius Cicero, nicknamed Pompey ‘Sampsiceramus’ to make fun of Pompey's pretensions as an eastern potentate. At the request of Pompey, Sampsiceramus I captured and killed the penultimate Seleucid King Antiochus XIII Asiaticus in 64 BC. After the death of Antiochus XIII, Sampsiceramus I was confirmed in power and his family was left to rule the surrounding region under Roman suzerainty. Client rulers such as Sampsiceramus I could police routes and preserve the integrity of Rome without cost to Roman manpower or to the Roman treasury; they were probably paid for the privilege.

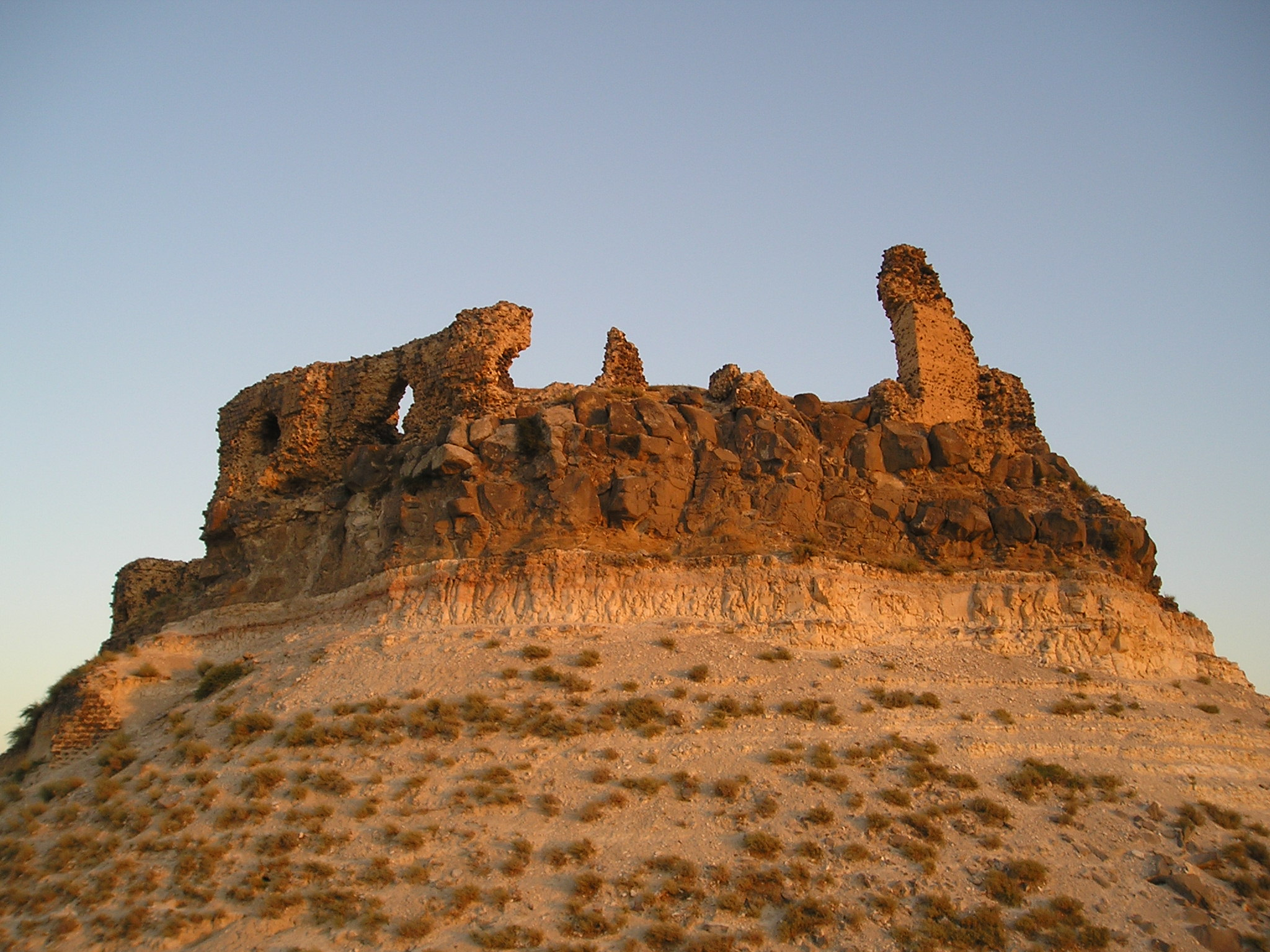
Ash Shmemis castle, built by Sampsiceramus I

Emesa was added to the domains of Sampsiceramus I, but the first Emesene capital was Arethusa, a city north of Emesa, along the Orontes River. The kingdom of Sampsiceramus I was the first of Rome's client kingdoms on the desert's fringes. The kingdom's boundaries extended from the Beqaa Valley in the West to the border of Palmyra in the East, from Yabrud in the South to Arethusa in the North and Heliopolis. During his reign, Sampsiceramus I built a castle at Shmemis on top of an extinct volcano and rebuilt the city of Salamiyah which the Romans incorporated in the ruled territory. In time, Sampsiceramus I established and formed a powerful ruling dynasty and a leading kingdom in the Roman East. His Priest-King dynasty ruled from 64 BC until at least 254.

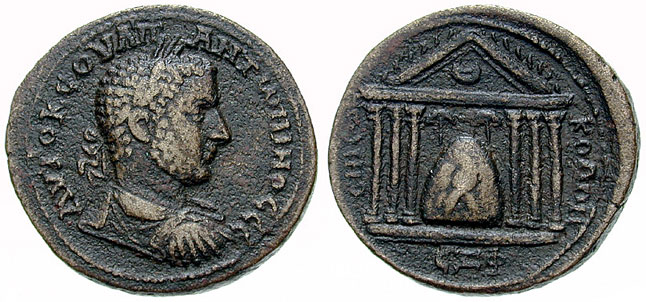
The Emesa temple to the sun god El-Gabal, with the holy stone, on the reverse of this 3rd-century AD bronze coin by Roman usurper Uranius Antoninus

When Sampsiceramus I died in 48 BC, he was succeeded by son, Iamblichus I. In his reign, the prominence of Emesa grew after Iamblichus I established it as the new capital of the Emesene dynasty. The economy of the Emesene Kingdom was based on agriculture. With fertile volcanic soil in the Orontes Valley and a great lake, as well as a dam across the Orontes south of Emesa, which provided ample water, Emesa's soil was ideal for cultivation. Farms in Emesa provided wheat, vines and olives. Emesa in antiquity was a very wealthy city. The city was a part of a trade route from the East, a route that went via Palmyra and passed through Emesa on its way to the coast. An example on how wealthy Emesa was, ancient pieces of jewellery have been found at the necropolis of Tell Abu Sabun, suggests that the engineering work demanded to be constructed along the lake. Apart from Antioch, a very important city for the Romans, this port city, prospered under its Roman vassal rulers.

Prior to succeeding his father, Iamblichus I was considered by Cicero in 51 BC (then Roman Governor of Cilicia), as a possible ally against Parthia. Shortly after Iamblichus I became priest-king, he had become prudent and supported the Roman politician Julius Caesar in his Alexandrian war against Pompey. Iamblichus I sent troops to aid Caesar. Pompey was the patron for the family of Iamblichus I, who was later defeated and killed. The Emesene dynasty had proven from the late Republic into the Imperial era that the dynasty were loyal to the Roman state.

After the death of Julius Caesar, for a brief period Iamblichus I supported the Roman Governor of Syria who was one of Julius Caesar's assassins. In the period of the Roman civil wars, Iamblichus I supported the Roman Triumvir Octavian. Iamblichus I became suspect to Roman Triumvir Mark Antony. Antony encouraged Iamblichus I's brother Alexander, to usurp his brother's throne and had Iamblichus I executed. Octavian, after defeating Antony and reorganising the Eastern Roman provinces, had Alexander executed for treason in 31 BC. From 30 BC until 20 BC, the Emesene Kingdom was dissolved and became an autonomous community free of dynastic rule though under the supervision of the Roman governor of Syria.

Later in 20 BC, Octavian, now as the Roman emperor Augustus, restored the Emesene Kingdom to Iamblichus II, the son of Iamblichus I. Iamblichus II was the first in his family to receive the Roman citizenship from Augustus, as the Emesene dynasty took the Roman gentilicium Julius to be added to their Aramaic, Arabic, Greek and later Latin names in tomb inscriptions in the 1st century AD. Iamblichus II ruled as a Priest-King from 20 BC to 14. Iamblichus II's reign was stable and from it emerged a new era of peace, known as the Golden Age of Emesa. Iamblichus II died in 14 and his grandson Sampsiceramus II succeeded him as priest-king. Sampsiceramus II ruled from 14 until his death in 42. According to a surviving inscription at the Temple of Bel in Palmyra, dating from the years 18/19 he may have acted as an intermediary between Palmyra and Rome. In the inscription he is mentioned alongside the Roman general Germanicus, the adoptive son and nephew of the Roman emperor Tiberius. Emesa was closely linked for its prosperity with its neighbour Palmyra. Before he died, Sampsiceramus II was convened by the Herodian King Agrippa I at Tiberias.

Sampsiceramus II is also known from other surviving inscriptional evidence. In one inscription dating from his reign, Sampsiceramus II with his wife Iotapa are known as a happy couple. Posthumously Sampsiceramus II is honoured by his son, Sohaemus in an honorific Latin inscription dedicated to his son while he was a Patron of Heliopolis during his reign as King. In this inscription, Sampsiceramus II is honored as a Great King [Regis Magni]. Sampsiceramus II ruled as a Great King at least in local parlance.

=== Azizus, Sohaemus and afterwards ===
After the death of Sampsiceramus II, his first son Azizus succeeded him. He reigned from 42 until 54. Little is known of the reign of Azizus, except for his childless marriage to the Herodian Princess Drusilla. Azizus married Drusilla in 53, on the condition that he was to be circumcised. She was briefly married to Azizus and Drusilla ended their marriage. She divorced him because she fell in love with Marcus Antonius Felix, a Greek Freedman who was the Roman Governor of Judea, whom she later married.

When Azizus died in 54, he was succeeded by his brother Sohaemus who reigned from 54 until his death in 73. Under the rule of Sohaemus, Emesa's relations with the government of Rome grew closer. In 70, in the Roman Siege of Jerusalem, Sohaemus sent Emesene archers to assist the Roman army. He also assisted the Roman emperor Vespasian, in 72, in annexing the Client State of the Kingdom of Commagene.

Sohaemus died in 73 and was succeeded by his son, Gaius Julius Alexion. Despite the fact that the Emesene dynasty were loyal allies to Rome, for unknown reasons the Roman State reduced the autonomous rule of the Emesene dynasty. Sohaemus was apparently the last king of the Emesene Kingdom and after his death in 78, the Kingdom most probably was absorbed by the Roman Province of Syria, but there is no explicit evidence of this occurring.

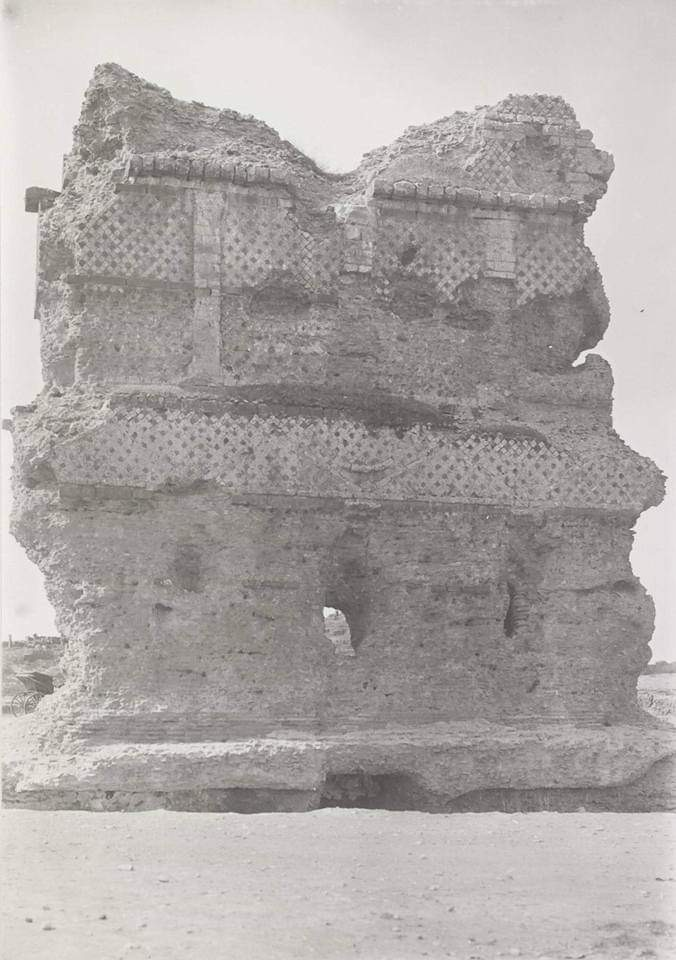
The Tomb of Sampsigeramus, photographed 1907. Its builder Gaius Julius Sampsigeramus may have been a relative of the Emesan dynasty.

Gaius Julius Sampsigeramus (fl. 78 or 79 AD)), "from the Fabia tribe, also known as Seilas, son of Gaius Julius Alexion," was the builder of the so-named Tomb of Sampsigeramus that formerly stood in the necropolis of Tell Abu Sabun, as recorded on an inscription said to have belonged to the monument. According to Maurice Sartre, the owner's Roman citizenship, attested by his tria nomina, strongly supports relatedness to the royal family. The lack of allusion to royal kinship is best explained if the dynasty had been deprived of its kingdom shortly before the mausoleum was built and the said kingdom had been annexed to the Roman province of Syria, which occurred very likely between 72 and the construction of the mausoleum. As worded by Andreas Kropp, "what the builder was really keen on stressing is that he was a Roman citizen bearing the tria nomina."

Between 211 & 217, the Roman emperor Caracalla, made Emesa into a Roman Colony, as this was partly due to the Severan dynasty's relations with and connections to Emesa. Partly due to the influence and rule of the Emesene dynasty, Emesa had grown and became one of the most important cities in the Roman East. Despite the Emesenes being a warlike people; they exported wheat, grapes and olives throughout the Roman world, and the city was part of the Eastern trade route which stretched from the mainland to the coast, which benefited the local and the Roman economy. The Emesenes sent men into the Roman legions and contributed their archers to the auxiliaries of the imperial army. In modern Syria, Emesa has retained its local significance as it is the market centre for surrounding villages.

== Archaeology ==
The royal family of Emesa is imperfectly known. What is known about the Emesene dynasty and their kingdom is from surviving archaeological evidence, as the ancient Roman historical sources do not provide a lot of information about them. It is from surviving inscriptions that we know the names of the Emesene Priest-Kings; the Emesene Priests, their known relatives and the limited information about them. As a capital of a Roman client kingdom, Emesa exhibits attributes of a Greek city-state and traces of Roman town planning.

Archaeological evidence remains from the Emesene dynasty in the city of Salamiyah which was rebuilt by Sampsiceramus I. Surviving monuments built by the Emesene dynasty includes the castle at Shmemis which is on top of an extinct volcano built by Sampsiceramus I and the Emesene dynastic tomb. Among those who are buried there is Alexander, Sohaemus and Julius Alexander. The remains of the Tomb of Sampsigeramus were blown up with dynamite by the Ottoman authorities c. 1911, in order to make room for an oil depot.

Coins have survived from the Emesene dynasty; the earliest known ones being issued for celebrating the cult of El-Gebal under the Roman emperor Antoninus Pius, 138-161. They depict an eagle perched on a black stone and an elaborate monumental altar being shown. Two superimposed row of niches, between two pilasters stand on a massive base; with statues in each of the six niches. Above is a smaller altar, surmounted by the great stone itself, ornamented with mysterious markings.

== List of members ==
=== Priest-Kings ===
The known Emesene Priest-Kings were:

- Sampsiceramus I (Šamšigeram), reigned 64 BC–48 BC, son of Aziz (Aziz, c. 94 BC) and paternal grandson of Iamblichus (Yamliḵu, c. 151 BC)
- Iamblichus I (son of Sampsiceramus I and brother of Alexander), reigned 48 BC–31 BC
- Alexander (brother of Iamblichus I and another son of Sampsiceramus I). Usurper to the Emesene throne in 31 BC and executed in the same year by Octavian
- The Emesene kingdom dissolved from 30 BC to 20 BC and becomes an autonomous community under the supervision of the Roman governor of Syria
- Iamblichus II (son of Iamblichus I), reigned 20 BC–14
- Gaius Julius Sampsiceramus II, also known as Sampsiceramus II (grandson of Iamblichus II), reigned 14–42
- Gaius Julius Azizus or Asisus (son of Sampsiceramus II), reigned 42–54
- Gaius Julius Sohaemus Philocaesar Philorhomaeus (brother to Azizus and second son to Sampsiceramus II), reigned 54–73
- Gaius Julius Alexion (son of Sohaemus), reigned 73–78

=== Reign uncertain ===
- Gaius Julius Sampsigeramus (fl. 78/79)

=== Usurpers (kinship uncertain) ===
- Uranius Antoninus, usurper 210–235: "it seems that Uranius Antoninus styled himself as a new Sampsigeramid king of Emesa"
- Uranius Antoninus, usurper 235–254: claimed that he was related to the Sampsigeramids"

=== Other ===
- C. (Iulius?) Longinus Sohaemus ("son of Sampsigeramus"), fl. 110
- Commagenean Princess Iotapa, married Sampsiceramus II. Iotapa bore Sampsiceramus II four children: two sons, Gaius Julius Azizus and Gaius Julius Sohaemus Philocaesar Philorhomaeus and two daughters, Iotapa who married the Herodian Prince Aristobulus Minor and Mamaea
- Mamaea married the Roman Client King Polemon II of Pontus, who through this marriage became Roman Client Queen of Pontus, Cilicia and Colchis.
- Julia Urania Queen of Mauretania, who may have been a minor Emesene Princess and married Roman Client King Ptolemy of Mauretania
- Drusilla, Mauretanian princess from North Africa, who was the daughter of Ptolemy of Mauretania and Julia Urania, married Gaius Julius Sohaemus Philocaesar Philorhomaeus, son of Sampsiceramus II and Iotapa. Drusilla and Sohaemus had a son called Gaius Julius Alexion
- Sohaemus of Armenia also known as Gaius Julius Sohaemus King of Armenia from 144 until 161, then again in 163 to perhaps up to 186
- Julius Alexander, an Emesene nobleman who could be the possible son of Sohaemus of Armenia who died in c. 190 and is a contemporary of the Roman emperor Commodus
- Julius Agrippa, an Emesene nobleman who served as a Primipilaris or a former leading centurion son of a Julius and paternal uncle of the Emesene High Priest Gaius Julius Bassianus
- The Emesene High Priest Gaius Julius Bassianus, son of a Julius and nephew of Julius Agrippa and a possible descendant of Drusilla of Mauretania and Gaius Julius Sohaemus Philocaesar Philorhomaeus. He married an unnamed woman by whom was the father of Julia Maesa and her younger sister, the Roman Empress Julia Domna
- Julia Domna, second wife of Roman emperor Lucius Septimius Severus; mother of the Severan Roman emperors Caracalla (born as Lucius Septimius Bassianus) and Publius Septimius Geta
- Julia Maesa, wife of the Syrian Roman politician Gaius Julius Avitus Alexianus by whom had two daughters: Julia Soaemias Bassiana and Julia Avita Mamaea
- Julia Soaemias Bassiana, wife of the Syrian Roman politician Sextus Varius Marcellus by whom she had one unnamed son and a second son, the Severan Roman emperor Elagabalus (born as Sextus Varius Avitus Bassianus)
- Julia Avita Mamaea, married first a senator of unknown name and then the Syrian Roman politician Gessius Marcianus and was possibly the mother of Marcus Julius Gessius Bassianus, but was definitely the mother of Theoclia and Severan Roman emperor Alexander Severus.
- Aemilius Papinianus (142–212) also known as Papinian, a celebrated Roman Jurist and Praetorian prefect who was a kinsman of Julia Domna

=== Descendants ===
- Zenobia, Queen of Palmyra in the 3rd century, is a possible descendant of Drusilla of Mauretania and Gaius Julius Sohaemus. Zenobia's possible descent from Drusilla might support Zenobia's claims of being a descendant of the last Queen of Egypt Cleopatra VII
- Iamblichus, 2nd century novelist, claims his ancestry from the Emesene Priest Kings and was a contemporary of Sohaemus of Armenia
- Iamblichus, 3rd century Neoplatonist, claimed to have been a descendant of the Emesene Priest Kings
- Uranius Antoninus, usurper in the 3rd century, may have been called Sampsiceramus, and have been an Emesene priest.
- Theodora of Emesa is a possible descendant of the Emesan dynasty. Patriarch of Constantinople, Scholar, and Christian Saint of the 9th century, Photios I, notes that around A.D. 500, the Syrian Pagan Philosopher Damascius dedicated a book to a Theodora, daughter of Diogenes, son of Eusebius, son of Flavianus and a descendant of King Sampsiceramus of Emesa
- Heliodorus of Emesa claims to have been a descendant of the Royal family of Emesa

== Family tree ==
Iamblichus (151 BC)
Aziz (94 BC)
Ptolemaus	Sampsiceramus I
Iamblichus I
Sohaemus	Iamblichus II (20 BC)	Cleopatra VII
Sampsiceramus II
Julia Urania	Ptolemy of Mauretania
Aziz
Sohaemus (65–75)	Drusilla
Gaius Julius Alexion
Julius Bassianus (d. 217)
Julia Domna	Julia Maesa
Caracalla	Geta	Julia Soaemias	Julia Avita Mamaea
Elagabalus	Alexander Severus

== See also ==
- Black Stone
- Elagabalus (deity)
- Homs

== Sources ==
- Ball, Warwick (2000). Rome in the East: The Transformation of an Empire. Routledge. ISBN 9780415113762.
- Birley, A. R. (2002). Septimius Severus: The African Emperor. Routledge.
- Chad, Carlos (1972). Les Dynastes d'Émèse (in French).
- Dudgeon, Michael H.; Lieu, Samuel N. C. (2002). The Roman Eastern Frontier and the Persian Wars AD 226-363. Routledge. ISBN 9781134961146.
- Dusenbury, David Lloyd (2021). Nemesius of Emesa on Human Nature: A Cosmopolitan Anthropology from Roman Syria. OUP Oxford. ISBN 9780192598981.
- Edwell, Peter (2007). Between Rome and Persia: The Middle Euphrates, Mesopotamia and Palmyra under Roman Control. Routledge. p. 198. ISBN 9781134095735.
- Fisher, Greg (2020). Rome, Persia, and Arabia: Shaping the Middle East from Pompey to Muhammad. Routledge. ISBN 9781000740905.
- Halsberghe, G. H. (1972). The Cult of Sol Invictus. Brill.
- Kropp, Andreas (2010). "Earrings, Nefesh and Opus Reticulatum: Self-Representation of the Royal House of Emesa in the First Century AD". In Kaizer, Ted; Facella, Margherita (eds.). Kingdoms and Principalities in the Roman Near East. Franz Steiner Verlag Stuttgart.
- Levick, B. (2007). Julia Domna, Syrian Empress. Taylor & Francis.
- Millar, Fergus. The Roman Near East.
- Morkot, R. (1996). The Penguin Historical Altas of Ancient Greece. Penguin Group.
- Retso, Jan (4 July 2013). The Arabs in Antiquity: Their History from the Assyrians to the Umayyads. Routledge. ISBN 978-1-136-87289-1.
- Roller, D. W. (1998). The Building Program of Herod the Great. University of California Press.
- Sartre, Maurice (2001). D'Alexandre à Zénobie : Histoire du Levant antique (in French). Fayard. ISBN 9782213640693.
- Sartre, Maurice (2005). The Middle East Under Rome. Belknap Press. p. 662. ISBN 9780674016835.
- Settipani, C. (2000). Continuité gentilice et continuité familiale dans les familles sénatoriales romaines à l'époque imperial. Oxford.
- Seyrig, Henri (1952). "Antiquités Syriennes 53: Antiquités de la Nécropole d'Émèse (1^{re} partie)". Syria. XXIX (3–4): 204–250. doi:10.3406/syria.1952.4788. JSTOR 4390311. (in French)
- Smallwood, E. Mary (2001). The Jews Under Roman Rule: From Pompey to Diocletian – a Study in Political Relations. BRILL. ISBN 9780391041554.
- Sommer, Michael (2017). Palmyra: A History. Routledge. ISBN 9781351347150.
- Stoneman, Richard (1992). Palmyra and Its Empire: Zenobia's Revolt Against Rome. University of Michigan Press. ISBN 9780472103874.
- Sullivan, Richard D. (1978). "The Dynasty of Emesa". In Hildegard Temporini; Wolfgang Haase (eds.). Politische Geschichte (Provinzen und Randvölker: Syrien, Palästina, Arabien). Berlin: Walter de Gruyter. pp. 198–219. doi:10.1515/9783110866940-008. ISBN 9783110866940.
- Tomlins, Frederick Guest (1844). A Universal History of the Nations of Antiquity. W. Milner.
- Wellesley, Kenneth (1989). The Long Year A.D. 69. Bristol Classical Press. ISBN 9781853990496.
- Zahran, Yasamin (2001). Philip the Arab: A Study in Prejudice. Stacey International. ISBN 9781900988285.
