= Iamblichus (phylarch) =

Emesene nobleman (died 31 BC)

Iamblichus I (Imperial Aramaic: 𐡉𐡌𐡋𐡊𐡅, romanized: Yamlīḵū; died 31 BC) was one of the phylarchs, or petty princes of the Arab tribe of the Emesenes in Emesa (now Homs, Syria). He was the son of Sampsiceramus I and is first mentioned by Marcus Tullius Cicero in a despatch, which he sent from Rome to Cilicia in 51 BC, and in which he writes that lamblichus had sent him intelligence about the movements of the Parthian troops of Pacorus I. Cicero speaks of Iamblichus as well disposed to the republic.

In 48 BC, Iamblichus I, Antipater the Idumaean, Ptolemy and other allies of the Romans, joined the campaign of Mithridates II in Egypt to support Julius Caesar, who was besieged in Alexandria. In the mid-40s BC, he supported the rebellion of Quintus Caecilius Bassus.

In the war between Octavianus and Mark Antony in 31 BC, lamblichus supported the cause of the latter. But after Gnaeus Domitius had gone over to Octavianus, Antony became suspicious of treachery, and accordingly put lamblichus to death by torture, along with several others.

Antony's suspicions were apparently excited against lamblichus by his own brother Alexander, who obtained the sovereignty after his brother's execution. But Alexander was shortly afterwards taken by Octavianus to Rome to grace his triumph, and then put to death. At a later period (20 BC) his son, Iamblichus II, obtained from Augustus the restoration of his father's dominions.
