= Iamblichus of Apameia =

4th century Greek philosopher

Iamblichus was an Ancient Greek Neoplatonic philosopher of Apameia (Syria), and a contemporary of the emperor Julian the Apostate (331–363) and Libanius. He was thought to have committed suicide during the last year of Valens' reign (378 AD).

He is often confused with Iamblichus Chalcidensis; but the time at which he lived, and his intimacy with Julian, show that he belongs to a later date. The emperor, where he speaks of him, bestows extravagant praise upon him.
