= Aristobulus Minor =

1st century prince from the Herodian Dynasty

Aristobulus Minor or Aristobulus the Younger (flourished 1st century BC and 1st century AD, died after 44 CE) was a prince from the Herodian Dynasty. He was of Jewish, Nabataean and Edomite ancestry.

He was the youngest son born to prince Aristobulus IV and princess Berenice of Judea. Aristobulus IV was the son of Herod the Great by Mariamne I, thus Aristobulus Minor was a grandson to Herod the Great.

When growing up, he was educated along with his eldest brothers, Herod Agrippa I and Herod of Chalcis in Rome, along with future Roman Emperor Claudius. Claudius and Aristobulus Minor became friends and he became in high favor with the future emperor. Claudius and Aristobulus Minor sent letters to each other.

Aristobulus Minor lived at enmity with Herod Agrippa I. Aristobulus Minor denounced Herod Agrippa I and forced him to leave from the protection of Flaccus, the Proconsul of Syria. Herod Agrippa I was charged with bribing the Damascenes to support their cause with the Proconsul against the Sidonians.

Aristobulus Minor married Iotapa II, a Syrian Princess from the Royal family of Emesa and daughter of King Sampsiceramus II and Queen Iotapa II who ruled Emesa from 14-42 CE. This marriage for Aristobulus was a promising marriage in dynastic terms. Iotapa II and Aristobulus Minor chose to live as private citizens in the Middle East. Iotapa II and Aristobulus Minor had a daughter also called Iotapa, who was deaf and mute. Apart from their daughter, they had no further descendants.

In the reign of Emperor Caligula 37-41 CE, Aristobulus Minor had opposed the emperor in setting up statues of himself in the Temple in Jerusalem. He outlived his brother Herod Agrippa I, who died in 44 CE, but we don't know of his fate after this.

== Family tree ==
Alexander	Alexandra
Herod the Great	Mariamne I d. 29 BC
Aristobulus d. 7 BC	Berenice I	Sampsiceramus II king of Emesa	Iotapa I
Mariamne III	Herod V	Herodias	Herod Agrippa I	Aristobulus Minor	Iotapa II

== Sources ==
- Schwartz, Seth (1990). Josephus and Judaean politics. Columbia studies in the classical tradition. Leiden, New York: Brill. p. 137. ISBN 90-04-09230-7. OCLC 21595783.-
