= Sampsiceramus II =

Priest King of Emesa

Sampsiceramus II (Imperial Aramaic: 𐡔𐡌𐡔𐡂𐡓𐡌, romanized: Šamšigeram, Ancient Greek: Γάϊος Ἰούλιος Σαμσιγέραμος, romanized: Gaius Julius Sampsigeramus; died 42 AD) was a Priest King of Emesa who reigned from 14 to 42 AD.

== Biography ==
Sampsiceramus II became the priest-king in Emesa following the death of his grandfather, Iamblichus II. His father Sohaemus ruled from 20 BC to 14 AD in Chalcis, as a vassal of Iamblichus II. According to a surviving inscription at the Temple of Bel in Palmyra, dating from the years 18/19, he may have acted as an intermediary between Palmyra and Rome. In the inscription he is mentioned alongside the Roman general Germanicus, the adoptive son and nephew of the Roman emperor Tiberius. Before he died, Sampsiceramus II was convened by the Herodian King Agrippa I at Tiberias.

Sampsiceramus II is also known from other surviving inscriptional evidence. In one inscription dating from his reign, Sampsiceramus II with his wife Iotapa are known as a happy couple. However, Iotapa bore Sampsiceramus II four children: two sons, Gaius Julius Azizus and Sohaemus, and two daughters, Iotapa and Mamaea.

After the death of Sampsiceramus II in 42 AD, his first son Azizus succeeded him. Posthumously Sampsiceramus II is honoured by his son, Sohaemus in an honorific Latin inscription dedicated to his son while he was a Patron of Heliopolis during his reign as King. In this inscription, Sampsiceramus II is honored as a Great King [Regis Magni]. Sampsiceramus II ruled as a Great King at least in local parlance.

== Sources ==
- Ball, Warwick (2000). Rome in the East: The Transformation of an Empire. Routledge. ISBN 9780415113762.
- Levick, Barbara (2007). Julia Domna: Syrian Empress. Taylor & Francis. ISBN 9781134323517.
- Tomlins, Frederick Guest (1844). A Universal History of the Nations of Antiquity. W. Milner.
