= Iotapa (daughter of Sampsiceramus II) =

1st century daughter of Sampsiceramus II of Emesa

Iotapa (also Iotape) (fl. 1st century CE) was a daughter of King Sampsiceramus II of Emesa who married the Herodian Prince Aristobulus Minor.

== Biography ==
Iotapa was an Arab Syrian Princess from the Royal family of Emesa who lived in the 1st century. She was the daughter of King Sampsiceramus II and Queen Iotapa who ruled Emesa (modern Homs Syria).

Iotapa married the Herodian Prince Aristobulus Minor, who was of Jewish, Nabataean and Edomite ancestry. He was a grandson of King of Judea, Herod the Great. Josephus eventually described Iotapa and Aristobulus as "private citizens".

Iotapa and Aristobulus had a daughter called Iotapa V. She was born deaf and mute. Apart from their daughter, they had no further descendants.

== Sources ==
- Schwartz, Seth (1990). Josephus and Judaean politics. Columbia studies in the classical tradition. Leiden, New York: Brill. p. 137. ISBN 90-04-09230-7. OCLC 21595783.
- Smith, Sir William (1849). Dictionary of Greek and Roman biography and mythology. Vol. 1. p. 301.
- Egyptian Royal Genealogy

== See also ==
- Iotapa (disambiguation)
