= Ptolemy of Mauretania =

King of Mauretania (AD 21–40)

Ptolemy
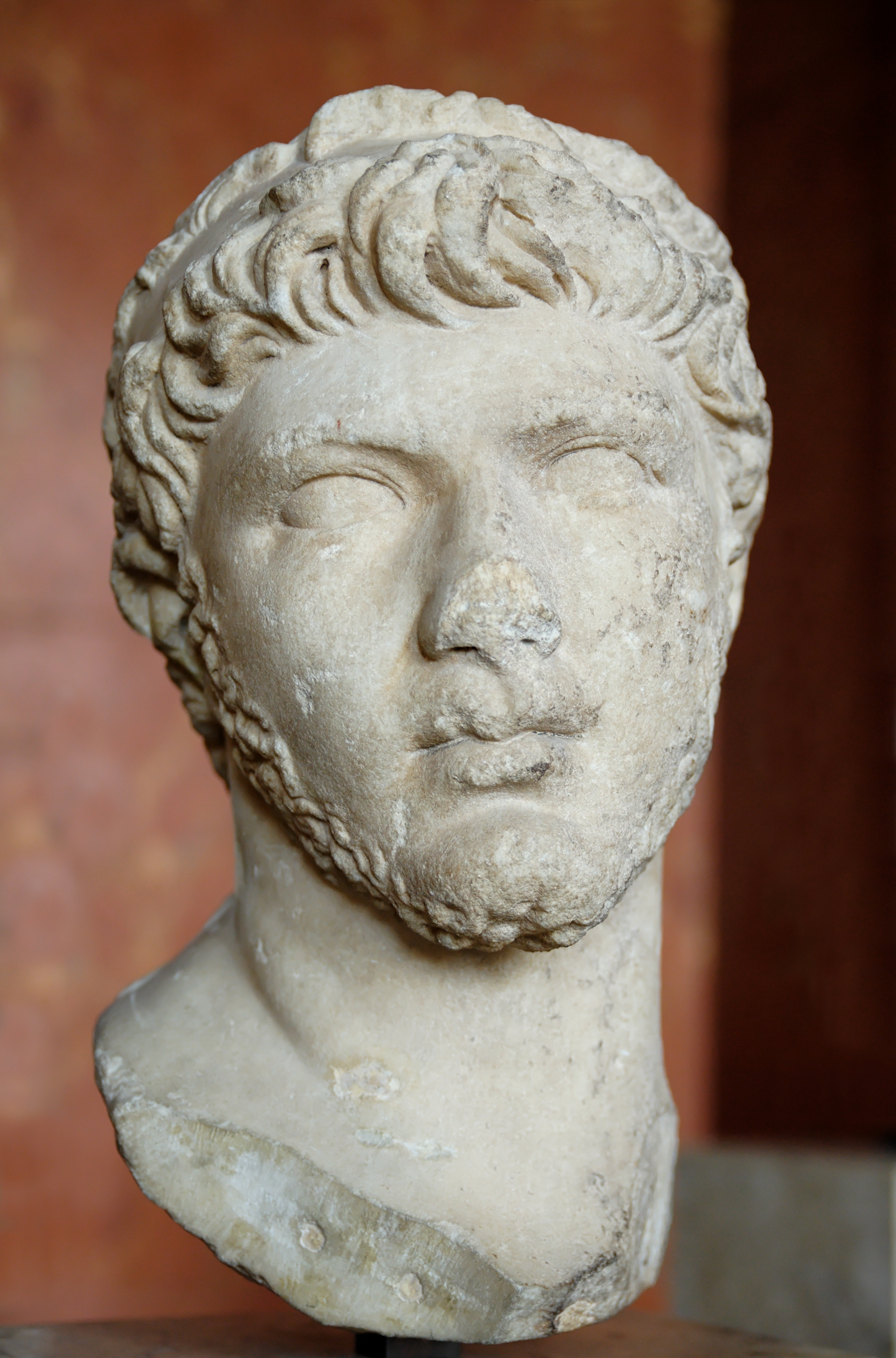
- Bust of Ptolemy, c. AD 10–40

King of Mauretania
- Reign: c. AD 21–40
- Predecessor: Juba II
- Successor: Caligula (as Roman emperor) (Note: Mauretania was annexed by the Roman Empire immediately after Ptolemy's death.)
- Co-ruler: Juba II (until AD 23)
- Born: c. 13–9 BC; Mauretania
- Died: AD 40 (aged 49–53); Rome
- Spouse: Urania (possibly)
- Issue: Drusilla (possibly)
- Dynasty: Kings of Numidia (paternal line); Ptolemaic dynasty (maternal line)
- Father: King Juba II
- Mother: Queen Cleopatra Selene II

Ptolemy of Mauretania (Ancient Greek: Πτολεμαῖος, Ptolemaîos; Latin: Ptolemaeus; c. 13/9 BC – AD 40) was the king of Mauretania, a client kingdom of the Roman Empire. He was the son of Juba II of Numidia and Cleopatra Selene II of the Ptolemaic dynasty. He was the grandson of Egyptian queen Cleopatra and Roman general Mark Antony through his mother, which made him a distant relative of the Julio-Claudian dynasty that ruled the Roman Empire.

During his reign, Mauretania became prosperous by exporting grain, oil, garum, and Tyrian purple dye to the Roman Empire. In AD 24, he helped Publius Cornelius Dolabella to defeat Tacfarinas, a rebel waging anti-Roman campaigns across North Africa. The Roman Senate honoured Ptolemy for his role in suppressing the revolt and named him a friend and ally of the Roman people.

He was later executed by the Roman emperor Caligula in AD 40 for unknown reasons. Although ancient sources said that Caligula was motivated by personal jealousy, modern historians have suggested that the emperor thought Ptolemy was a political threat. Upon Ptolemy's death, the Roman Empire annexed Mauretania and turned it into a Roman province. The kingdom rebelled against Roman control until it was subdued by emperor Claudius and separated into the provinces of Mauretania Tingitana and Mauretania Caesariensis.

== Early life and education ==
=== Ancestry ===
Ptolemy was the son of King Juba II and Queen Cleopatra Selene II of Mauretania, a client kingdom of the Roman Empire. The couple were appointed rulers of Mauretania by the Roman emperor Augustus in 25 BC. Juba II was the son of King Juba I of Numidia and was raised in Rome as a captive after the Roman conquest of Numidia in 46 BC. Cleopatra Selene II was the daughter of the Ptolemaic queen Cleopatra of Egypt and the Roman general Mark Antony. She was raised in Rome after Augustus conquered Egypt and her parents committed suicide in 30 BC.

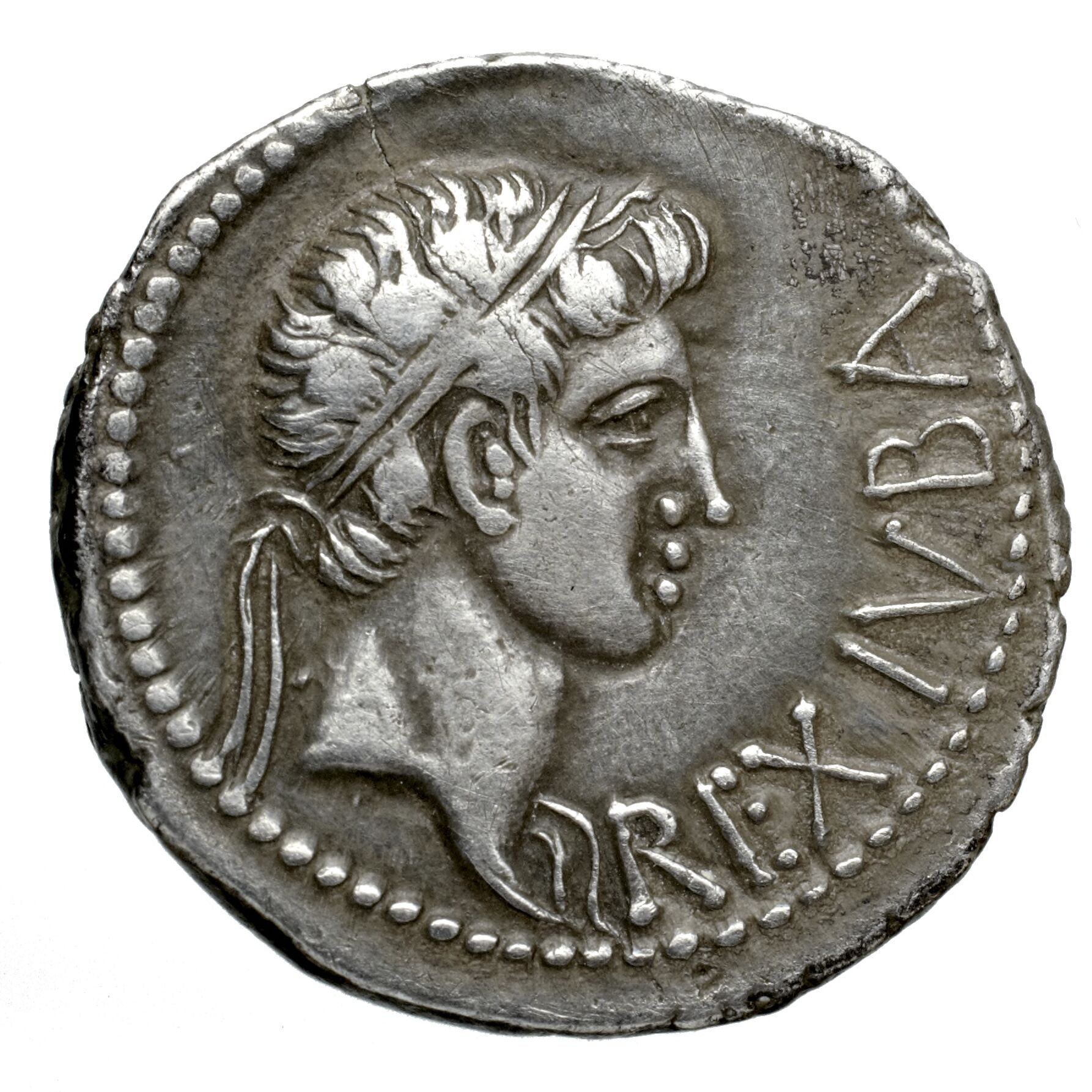
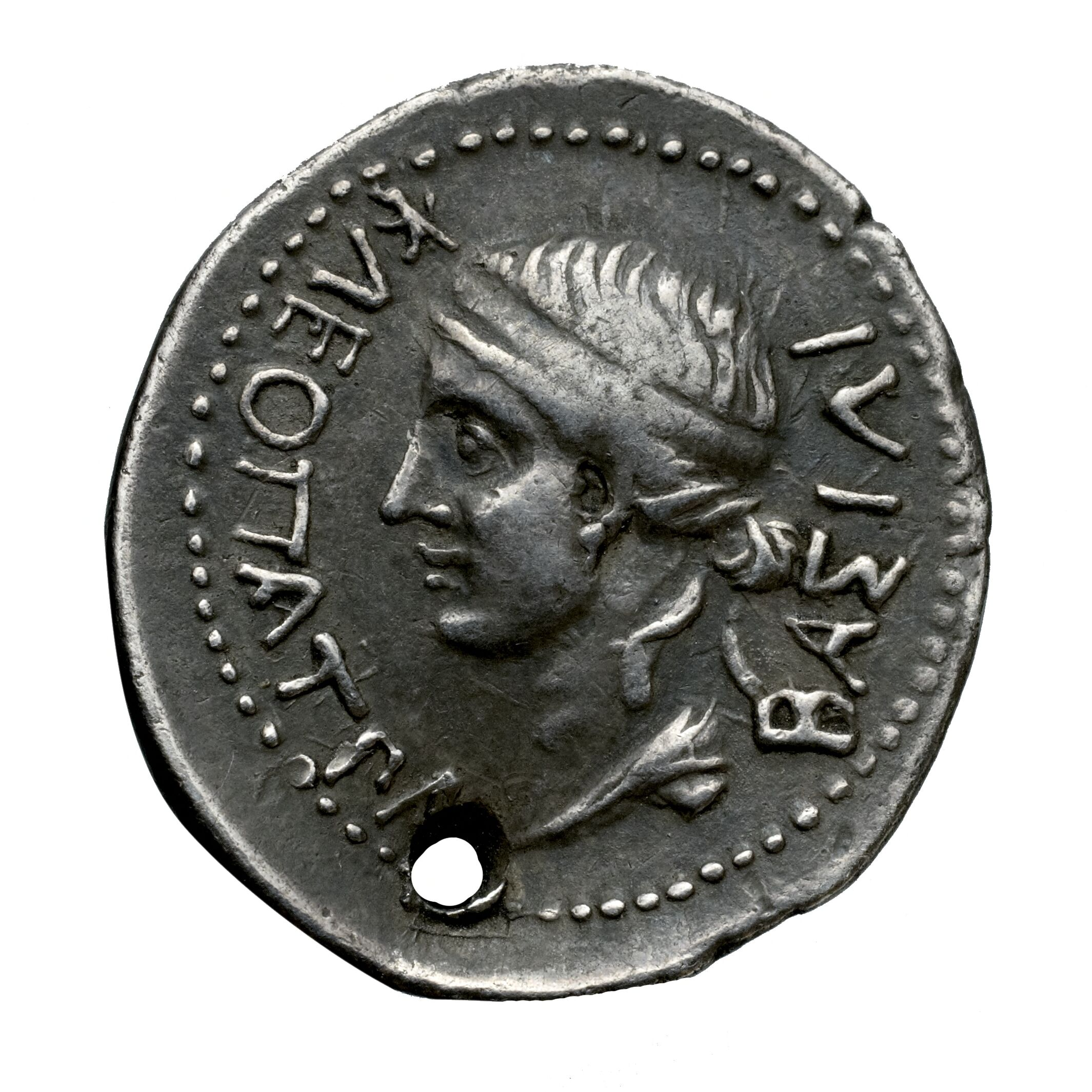
Mauretanian denarius coins portraying Juba II (left) and Cleopatra Selene II (right), issued c. 25 BC–AD 23

Cleopatra Selene II and Juba II promoted Greek and Egyptian culture in Mauretania's capital Caesarea through art and architectural programs and the creation of a royal library. Their royal court functioned as a Ptolemaic government-in-exile since Cleopatra Selene II was the last surviving member of the dynasty. She could theoretically claim a right to rule most of North Africa, although there is no evidence that she formally claimed these territories.

Ptolemy was a member of the Ptolemaic dynasty, although his grandmother Cleopatra is popularly described as the last Ptolemaic ruler. His mother named him 'Ptolemy', as was traditional for male members of the Ptolemaic dynasty, instead of giving him a Numidian or Roman name. Through his grandfather Mark Antony, (Note: Antony's daughter Antonia Minor was the maternal ancestor of Caligula, Claudius, and Nero.) Ptolemy was also related to the Julio-Claudian dynasty that ruled the Roman Empire. Sculptures of Ptolemy portray him with a youthful appearance and comma-shaped locks of hair around his forehead; this iconography connected him with his relatives in the Julio-Claudian dynasty.

=== Youth and education ===
Ptolemy was likely born between 13 and 9 BC. He might not have been the first child born to his parents, who had been married for approximately a decade by the time of his birth. An inscription from Athens mentions a 'daughter of King Juba'; this woman, whose name is unrecorded, was likely born to Cleopatra Selene II. A fragment of the Ara Pacis, a Roman monument commissioned in 13 BC, might depict Cleopatra Selene II and an otherwise unattested son. This child would have been born in approximately 20 BC based on his age in the frieze, and must have died before Ptolemy became king in AD 23 or 24.

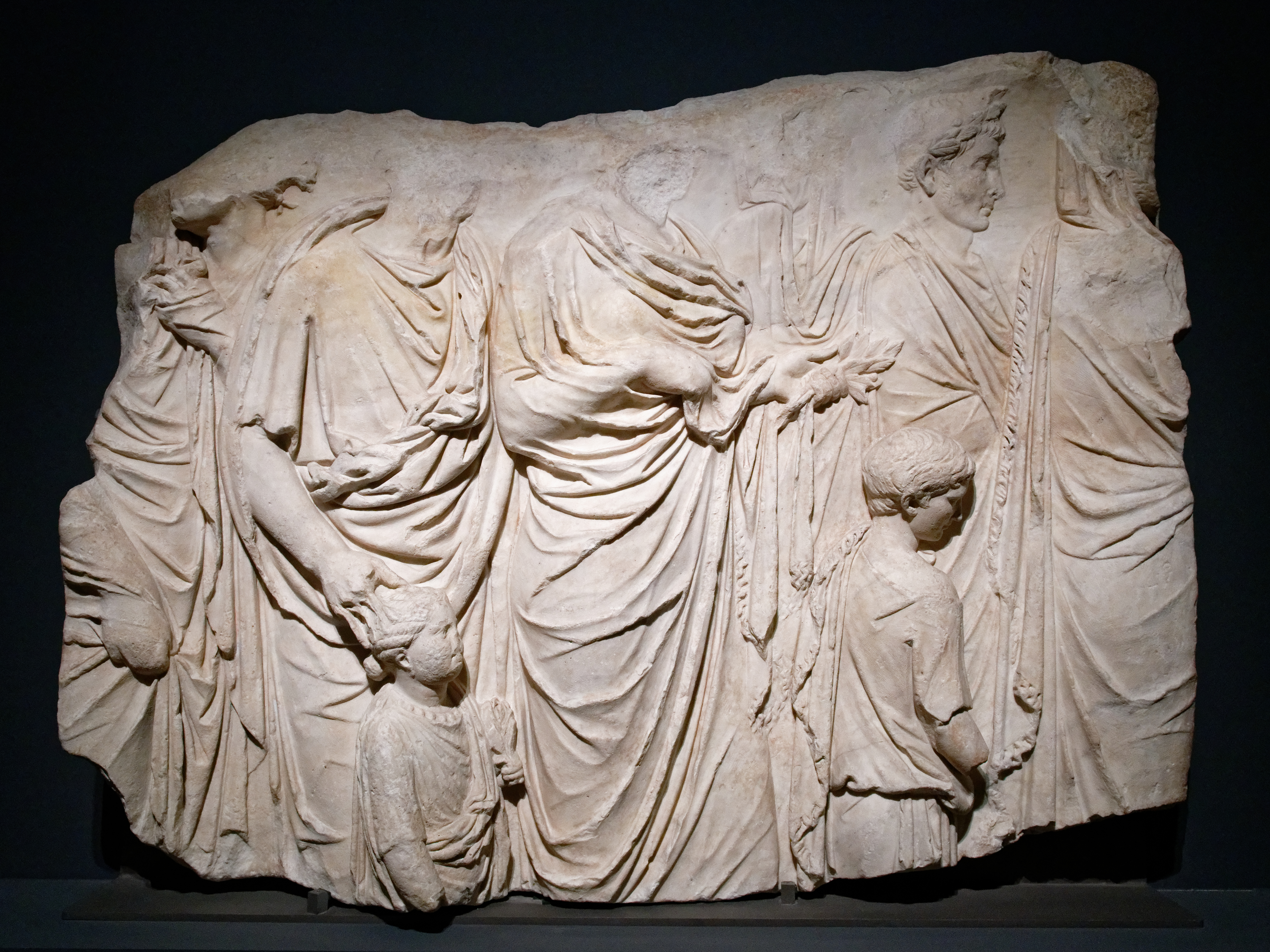
This fragment of the Ara Pacis may depict Cleopatra Selene II (center) and her son (right) in 13 BC.

Ptolemy was related to Drusilla, who is described by the Roman historian Tacitus as either a granddaughter or descendant of Cleopatra and Mark Antony. Tacitus' account does not specify who Drusilla's parents were, and her relationship to Ptolemy is unclear. Drusilla may have been born to Cleopatra Selene II in the late 1st century BC, or she might have been Ptolemy's daughter, born in the early 1st century AD.

He was probably educated in Athens, where he was honoured with a statue at the Gymnasium of Ptolemy. The gymnasium was founded by one of his ancestors, likely either Ptolemy III or Ptolemy VI. He also received honours from the Lycian Federation in Xanthos. It is probable that he had Roman citizenship and received some education at Rome, as was common for Roman client kings. His mother died sometime between 5 BC and AD 11, and was buried in the Royal Mausoleum of Mauretania.

== Reign ==
=== Background and co-regency ===
As client-kings of the Roman Empire, the Mauretanian kings were expected to keep the Roman Empire's frontiers safe. However, they risked overstepping their authority if they took independent military actions without Roman approval. In Mauretania’s neighbouring territories, there was continuous conflict between Roman armies and pastoral Berber tribes, including the Gaetulians and Garamantes. These tribes revolted against Roman rule and the growing population of foreign settlers, and these revolts had spread to Mauretania by AD 3.

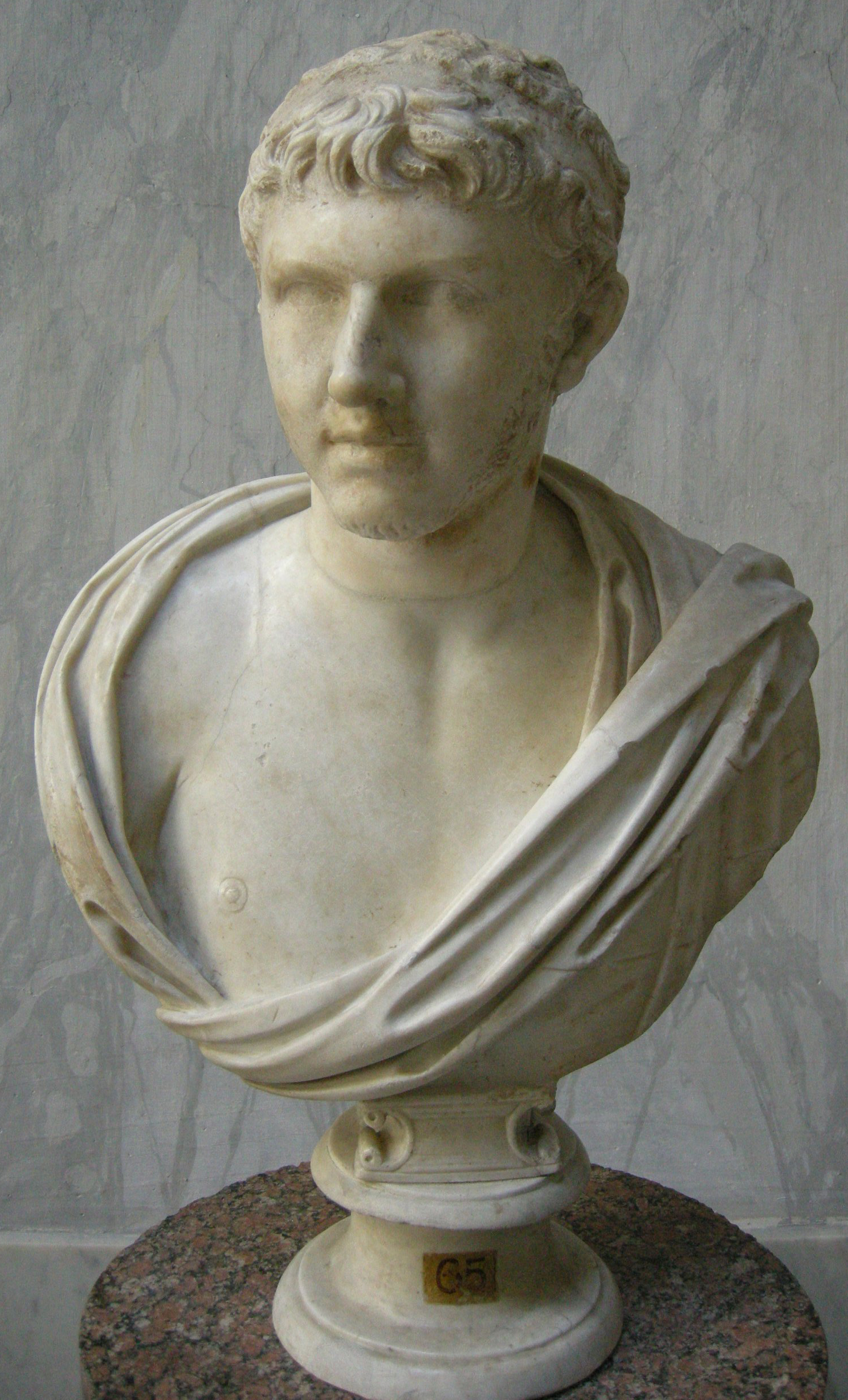
Bust of Ptolemy, c. AD 20

In AD 17, Juba II faced a revolt led by Tacfarinas, a Gaetulian who had formerly served in the Roman army as an auxiliary. Tacfarinas waged anti-Roman guerrilla campaigns across North Africa in defiance of the Roman emperor Tiberius. Juba II and his Roman allies achieved limited victories against the rebels but failed to capture Tacfarinas, who regrouped and continued his rebellion. By AD 21, Juba II had made Ptolemy co-regent. Juba II likely wanted to ensure a stable succession as he was growing old and the kingdom faced continued disturbances from Tacfarinas.

=== Sole reign ===
In AD 23 or 24, Juba II died and was buried alongside his wife in the Royal Mausoleum. Ptolemy became the sole ruler of Mauretania and also inherited his father's honorary position as duumvir quinquennalis of Carthago Nova. The title of duumvir quinquennalis was given to the two chief magistrates of a town or colony, who served a five-year term together. During the Julio-Claudian era, members of the imperial family were often given honorary titles as magistrates of prominent cities in the Roman Empire. Other dignitaries with personal ties to the emperor sometimes also received honorary appointments as duumvir.

Around the time of Ptolemy's ascension, Publius Cornelius Dolabella, the Roman proconsul of Africa, was sent to stop Tacfarinas' rebellion. Ptolemy assisted Dolabella’s successful campaign against Tacfarinas, which saw the rebel leader killed at Augea. The Roman Senate honoured Ptolemy for his conduct in the war, naming him a 'friend and ally of the Roman people'. The Senate sent him further honours in AD 24, including a ceremonial ivory sceptre, gold crown, curule seat, and toga picta. The toga picta was a purple toga with gold decorations, traditionally worn by victorious generals during a Roman triumph. Tiberius permitted client kings to wear the toga picta, which his predecessor Augustus had not allowed. Mauretanian coins minted by Ptolemy portray the gifts that he received from the Senate. Historian Duane W. Roller considered the war to be an important episode in Ptolemy's career that demonstrated his competence, while Anthony A. Barrett suggested that he did not contribute much to the campaign's success and the Romans only honoured him as a diplomatic gesture because of his popularity.

During the reign of Ptolemy, Mauretania was an important producer of grain, olive oil, garum, rare Tyrian purple dye, and luxury woods like citrus, olive, and cedar. It exported these goods to Rome, as well as exotic animals that were used for spectacles in the Colosseum. This trade made Mauretania prosperous, and Ptolemy's wealth reportedly aroused the jealousy of his cousin emperor Caligula. Unlike his father, who had a reputation for being a scholarly king, Ptolemy was reputed to be an immature ruler who was controlled by members of his court. Near the end of his reign, Ptolemy began to act independently of Rome. He also minted an issue of Mauretanian gold coins, which he might not have been permitted to do as a client king.

Little is known of the king's personal life. A woman named 'Queen Urania' is mentioned on an inscription from Caesarea, and might have been associated with the Mauretanian royal court during Ptolemy's reign. She has been identified as his concubine or wife. Egyptologist Chris Bennett suggested that Urania might have been married to Juba II at the end of his life, but considered it more likely that she was Ptolemy's wife.

== Death ==
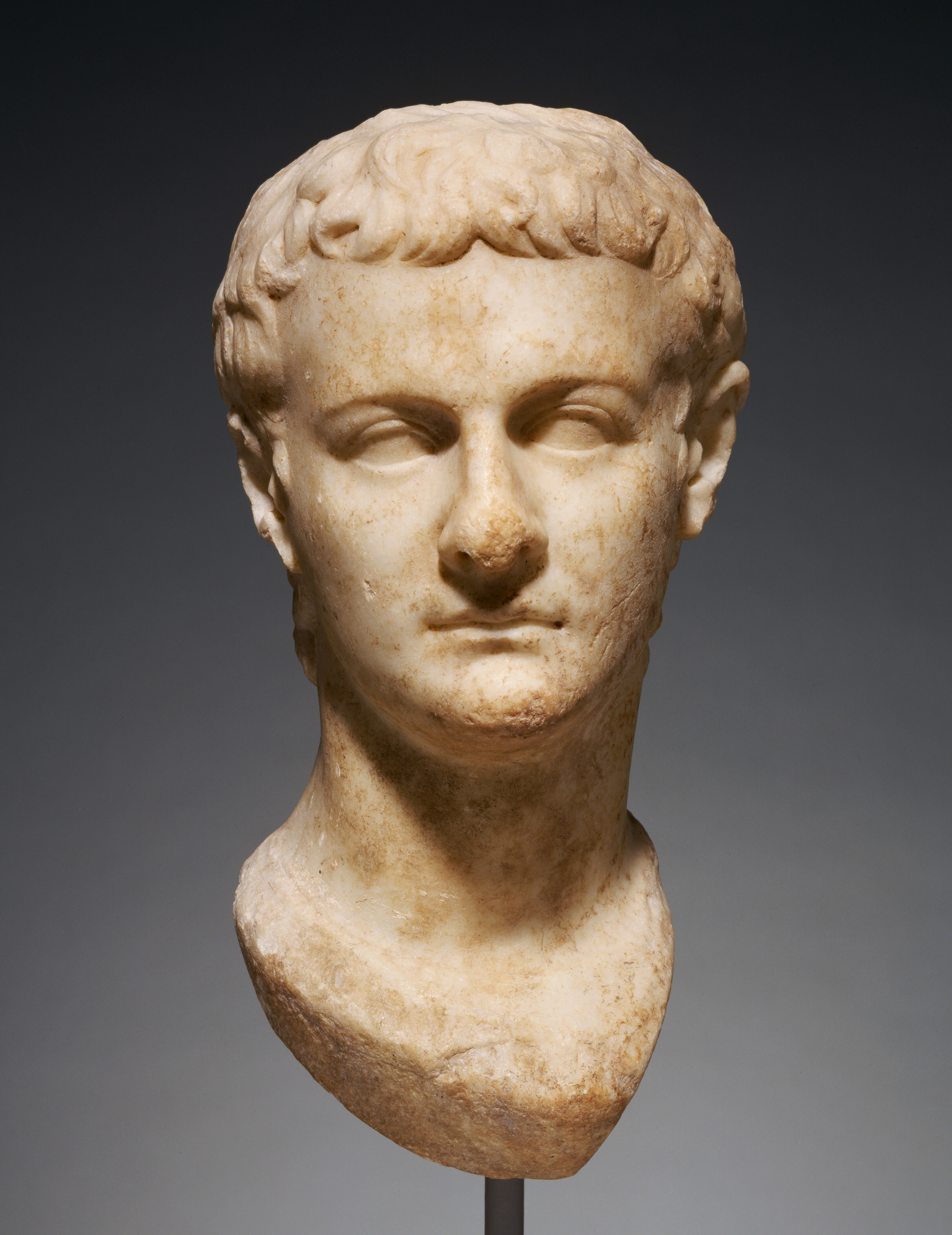
Bust of Caligula, c. AD 37

Sometime in late AD 39 or early 40, Ptolemy was summoned to Rome by Caligula. According to the Roman historian Suetonius, Ptolemy was originally supposed to receive honours in Rome, but Caligula instead had him arrested. He was imprisoned for an unspecified period of time before being executed. His execution likely took place sometime after the spring of AD 40, when Caligula returned from the northern provinces where he had been unsuccessfully preparing to invade Britain.

Ancient historical accounts provide differing explanations for Caligula's sudden hostility to Ptolemy. The Roman historian Cassius Dio claimed that Caligula was simply envious of Ptolemy's wealth. Suetonius claimed that Ptolemy aroused the emperor's jealousy while attending a spectacle in the amphitheatre, because his impressive purple attire drew admiration from the audience.

Modern historians have suggested more complex political motives for Caligula's behaviour. Roller suggested that the emperor felt that Ptolemy was a potential threat because of his wealth, independent behaviour as king, and close diplomatic ties to regions in the Greek cultural sphere. Caligula's pattern of hostility towards his relatives might also have been a factor, since Ptolemy was his cousin. Barrett suggested that Caligula might have been offended when he saw the purple toga picta worn by Ptolemy because it signified the king's military achievements, especially since Caligula had just returned from relatively unsuccessful campaigns in the northern provinces.

Historians Duncan Fishwick and Brent Shaw theorised that Ptolemy's execution might have been related to the execution of Gnaeus Cornelius Lentulus Gaetulicus, the governor of Germania Superior. Gaetulicus was executed in AD 39 for allegedly conspiring against Caligula. It is possible that Ptolemy was suspected of involvement in the conspiracy since their families were at one time connected; Gaetulicus' father Cossus Cornelius Lentulus Gaetulicus had been Juba II's ally in the wars against the Gaetulians. Fishwick and Shaw both proposed that the king was almost certainly innocent, and might have been wrongfully accused.

Most statues of Ptolemy in Mauretania and Rome were probably destroyed after his death as a form of damnatio memoriae, a modern term for the politically motivated destruction or mutilation of portraiture. The destruction of a person's portraiture served to erase their legacy and remove them from collective memory. Most incidences of damnatio memoriae in the Roman Empire were perpetrated against members of the imperial family or individuals accused of conspiring against the emperor. Surviving portraits of Ptolemy from Rome and Caesarea were likely removed from public view and put into storage shortly after his death.

=== Annexation of Mauretania ===
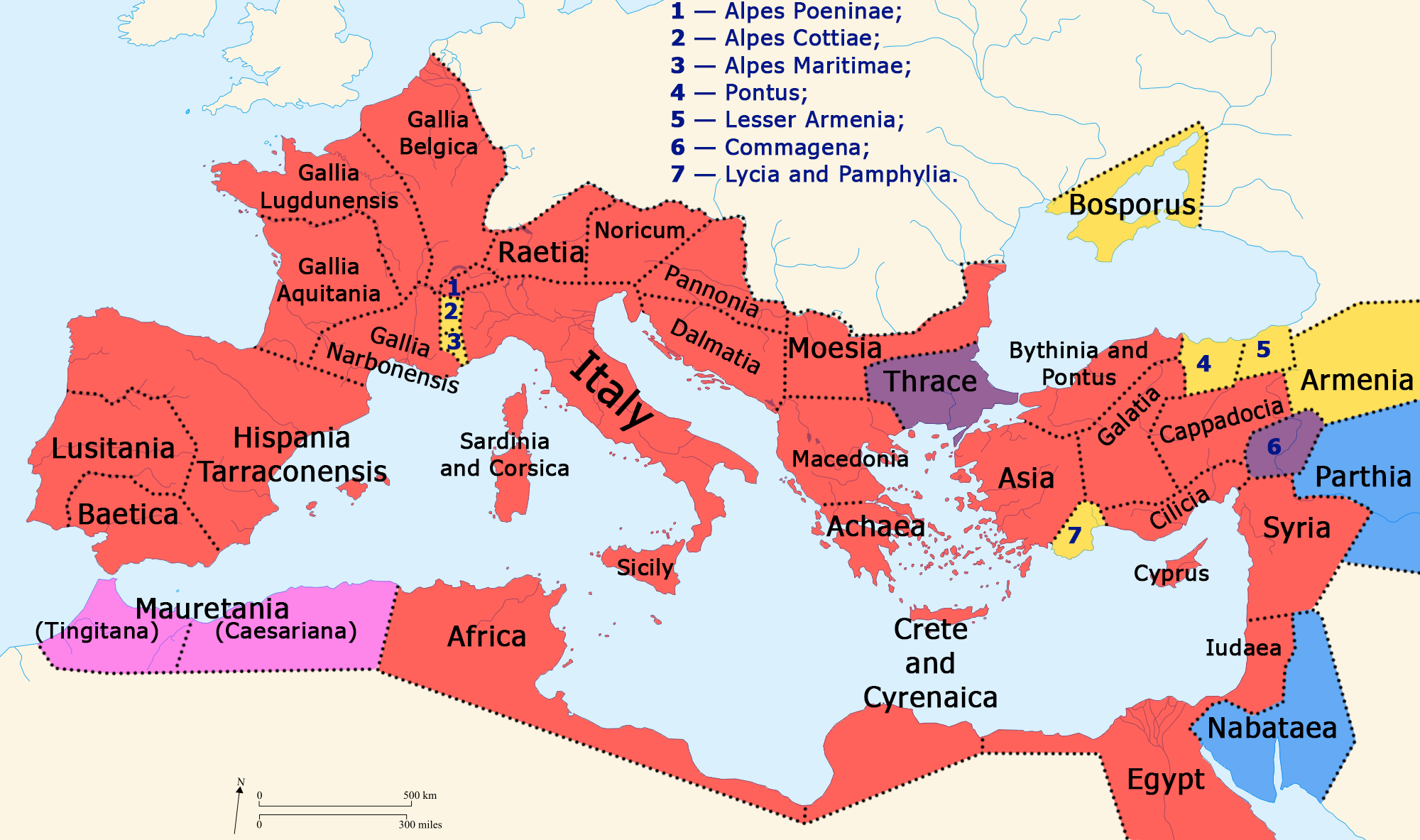
Map of the Roman Empire in the mid 1st century AD, showing Mauretania Tingitana and Mauretania Caesariensis

Caligula attempted to annex Mauretania upon the death of Ptolemy, but faced a rebellion by a group of Mauretanians loyal to the king. This rebellion was led by Aedemon, who had served the king as either a freedman or minor chieftain. The revolt impacted several Mauretanian cities, resulting in the destruction and abandonment of Tamuda, and the partial destruction of Volubilis and Lixus. The Mauretanian revolt was suppressed shortly before Claudius succeeded Caligula as emperor in AD 41.

Another anti-Roman rebellion broke out in AD 42. During the period of instability created by the rebellion, Mauretania was raided by the Berber tribes that had fought Juba II and Ptolemy in previous years. Claudius sent Gaius Suetonius Paulinus and Gnaeus Hosidius Geta to suppress the revolt and establish Roman control over Mauretania. They faced intense resistance from the Berber tribes, who targeted important trade routes between Mauretania and Rome. Suetonius and Geta succeeded in establishing control over Mauretania, but were unable to completely eradicate resistance in the region.

Mauretania was difficult for the Roman Empire to subdue and administer because it consisted of two distinct regions separated by two mountain ranges, the Atlas Mountains and the Rif Mountains. Claudius addressed this by separating Mauretania into two provinces, Mauretania Tingitana and Mauretania Caesariensis. Each province was governed by its own procurator, who was appointed by the emperor. Claudius also founded new military colonies throughout the Mauretanian provinces and reinforced existing ones that had been established in the reign of Augustus.

The annexation of Mauretania was a significant event in the reign of Claudius, who received triumphal honours for its conquest. It was also an important event in the Roman exploration of sub-Saharan Africa as Paulinus’ conquests brought him to the Atlas Mountains, which were at the edge of the known world to the Romans. Paulinus explored further and led expeditions into Africa south of the Atlas Mountains, documenting parts of Africa that were previously poorly understood by the Romans.
