= Iotapa (spouse of Sampsiceramus II) =

Iotapa (born around 20 BC-unknown date of death) was a princess of Commagene, daughter of King Mithridates III of Commagene. She became the Queen consort of Syrian King Sampsiceramus II of Emesa.

== Biography ==
Iotapa was a princess from the Kingdom of Commagene, who lived in the second half of the 1st century BC and the first half of the 1st century. She was one of the daughters of King Mithridates III of Commagene and Queen Iotapa of Commagene. Iotapa was of Armenian, Greek and Median descent. She was most probably born, raised and educated in Samosata, the capital of the Kingdom of Commagene.

Iotapa married King Sampsiceramus II from the Royal family of Emesa, Syria. The marriage probably occurred between 5 BCE and 5 CE. Through her marriage to Sampsiceramus II, she became Queen of Emesa.

With Sampsiceramus II, Iotapa had four children: two daughters, Iotapa and Mamaea; and two sons, Gaius Julius Azizus and Gaius Julius Sohaemus. Her daughter Iotapa would marry Aristobulus, while her sons would become kings of Emesa.

From a surviving inscription dated from the reign of her husband, Sampsiceramus II along with Iotapa are known as a happy couple.

== Sources ==
- H. Temporini & W. Haase, 2, Principat: 9, 2, Volume 8, Walter de Gruyter, 1978
- Roller, Duane W (1998). The Building Program of Herod the Great. University of California Press. ISBN 0-520-20934-6.
- Chahin, Mark (2001). The Kingdom of Armenia. Routledge. pp. 190–191. ISBN 0-7007-1452-9.
- Levick, Barbara (2007). Julia Domna, Syrian Empress, Taylor & Francis
- Royal Egyptian Genealogy: Ptolemaic Descendants

== See also ==
- Iotapa (disambiguation)
