= Gessius Marcianus =

2nd/3rd century Syrian-born Roman nobleman

Gessius Marcianus (flourished second half of the 2nd century and first half of the 3rd century, died 218) was a Syrian Roman aristocrat. He was the second husband of Julia Avita Mamaea and step-father of the future emperor Severus Alexander.

== Early life ==
Little is known about the origins of Marcianus. He was an Equestrian officer who became a Promagistrate. No further details are known of the political career of Marcianus.

== Family ==
Cassius Dio mentions a daughter that was married in 218 AD, thus probably a child from a previous marriage than the one to Mamaea. Marcianus married the Roman Syrian noblewoman Julia Avita Mamaea, as her second husband. Mamaea was the second daughter of the powerful Roman Syrian nobles Julia Maesa and Julius Avitus. Her maternal aunt was the Roman empress Julia Domna (wife of emperor Septimius Severus), thus her maternal cousins were Roman emperors Caracalla and Publius Septimius Geta, she was also the maternal aunt to Roman emperor Elagabalus. The marriage of Marcianus and Mamaea may have strengthened Septimius Severus' power base in the Roman Eastern provinces. He and Mamaea may have had a son named Marcus Julius Gessius Bassianus. The Historia Augusta also mentions a sister of Severus Alexander named Theoclia who was of marriageable age during Alexanders reign.

== Death ==
He was murdered on the orders of Roman emperor Macrinus in 218 in Emesa, Syria alongside an unnamed daughter and son-in-law.

== Severan dynasty family tree ==
Severan family tree

Septimius Macer
Gaius Claudius Septimius Aper	Fulvius Pius	Lucius Septimius Severus
Publius Septimius Aper	Gaius Septimius Aper	Fulvia Pia	Publius Septimius Geta	Septimia Polla	Julius Bassianus
Septimius	Publius Septimius Geta	Septimia Octavilla	Paccia Marciana (1)	Septimius Severus (r. 193–211)	Julia Domna (2)	Julia Maesa	Gaius Julius Avitus Alexianus
Gaius Septimius Severus Aper	Fulvia Plautilla	Caracalla (r. 197–217)	Geta (r. 209–211)	Julia Soaemias	Sextus Varius Marcellus	Julia Avita Mamaea	Unknown (2)
Julia Cornelia Paula (1)	Aquilia Severa (2 and 4)	Elagabalus (r. 218–222)	Annia Faustina (3)	Sallustia Orbiana	Severus Alexander (r. 222–235)

- (1) = 1st spouse
- (2) = 2nd spouse
- (3) = 3rd spouse
- (4) = 4th spouse
- Dark green indicates an emperor of the Severan dynasty

Notes:

Except where otherwise noted, the notes below indicate that an individual's parentage is as shown in the above family tree.

Bibliography:

- Birley, Anthony R. (1999). Septimius Severus: The African Emperor. London: Routledge. ISBN 0415165911.
- Gibbon, Edward; Smith, William (1889). The Student's Gibbon: The Decline and Fall of the Roman Empire. London: Murray. OCLC 993285639.

== Sources ==
- Augustan History, The Two Maximini
- A.R. Birley, Septimius Severus: The African Emperor, Routledge, 2002
- Julia Avita Mamaea’s article at Livius.org
- Alexander Severus (A.D. 222–235) - De Imperatoribus Romanis by H.W. Benario
