= Julia Augusta =

Julia Augusta (Ivlia Avgvsta) may refer to:

- Livia (58 BC–29 AD), Julia Augusta, Augustus' third wife
- Agrippina the Younger (15–59 AD), Augusta, Claudius' fourth wife
- Julia Domna (170–217), Augusta, wife of Septimius Severus
- Julia Cornelia Paula, Elagabalus' first wife
- Aquilia Severa Augusta, Elagabalus' second and fourth wife
- Julia Avita Mamaea (died 235), Augusta, Severus Alexander's mother
- Cornelia Salonina (died 268), Augusta, Gallienus' wife
- Zenobia (240–?), empress of the Palmyrene Empire
- Helena, Constantine I's mother

== See also ==
- Augusta (title)
