= Gaius Cassius Regallianus =

Early 3rd century Roman senator and consul

Gaius Cassius Regallianus was a Roman senator active around AD 200. He was appointed consul suffectus in 202 as the colleague of Titus Murenius Severus.

Both Regallianus and his colleague were unknown to historians until the publication in 2001 of a military diploma. This discovery, and especially Regallianus' existence, attracted attention, for previously the only known occurrence of the cognomen "Regal(l)ianus" is that of a usurper, Regalianus, who in 260 revolted against the emperor Gallienus, in the area of the Danube. He is known only by the coins he had struck and a passage in the unreliable Historia Augusta. The coins minted from the usurper bear his name as P C REGALIANVS, whose nomen is usually expanded as Cornelius, although other possibilities are not excluded.

The presence, in the early 3rd century, of a consul with the rare cognomen Regalianus and belonging to a family whose name begins with 'C' opens the way to some interesting possibilities. A Regalianus descended from this consul might have been appointed governor of Moesia or Pannonia, and have rebelled against Gallienus. This would also solve a problem raised by the Historia, which states Regalianus was of equestrian rank, while his governorship required the senatorial rank, as did the consulate.

== See also ==
- Regalianus

== Notes ==
Political offices
Preceded by Septimius Severus, and Caracalla as Ordinary consuls	Suffect consul of the Roman Empire; 202 with Titus Murrenius Severus	Succeeded by Gaius Fulvius Plautianus, and Publius Septimius Geta as Ordinary consuls
