= Julia Avita Mamaea =

Mother of Roman emperor Alexander Severus (died 235)

- Augusta
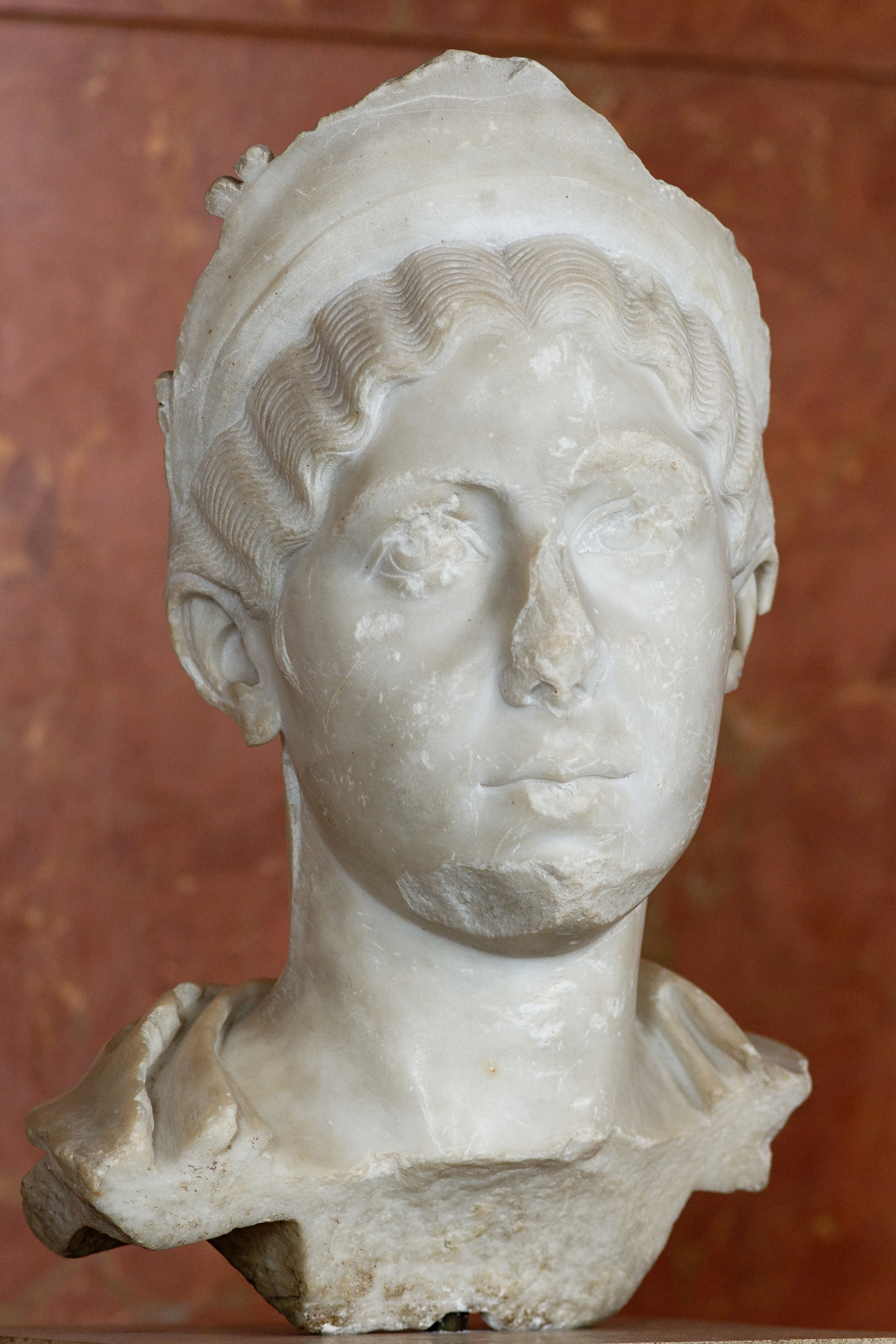
- Bust of Julia Mamaea, Louvre
- Born: Around 182-192 AD; Emesa, Syria
- Died: March 21/22 235 AD; Germania Superior
- Spouse: Unknown consul (1st husband); Gessius Marcianus (2nd husband)
- Issue: Alexander Severus; Marcus Julius Gessius Bassianus (possibly); Theoclia (possibly)
Names
- Julia Avita Mamaea
Regnal name
- Julia Avita Mamaea Augusta
- Dynasty: Severan
- Father: Gaius Julius Avitus Alexianus
- Mother: Julia Maesa

Julia Avita Mamaea or Julia Mamaea (14 or 29 August around 182 – March 21/22 235) was a Syrian noble woman and member of the Severan dynasty. She was the mother of Roman emperor Alexander Severus and remained one of his chief advisors throughout his reign. She was killed in 235 by rebel soldiers alongside her son.

== Family ==
Julia Avita Mamaea was the second daughter of Julia Maesa, a powerful Roman woman of Syrian origin, and Syrian noble Gaius Julius Avitus Alexianus. She was a niece of empress Julia Domna, emperor Lucius Septimius Severus, and sister of Julia Soaemias Bassiana. She was born and raised in Emesa (modern Homs, Syria), where her family was very powerful.

Julia's first husband was an unknown former consul who died. Her only undisputed child, Severus Alexander, whom she gave birth to on October 1, 208 in Arca Caesarea, may have been from this marriage instead of her second as Dio claimed. She then married her second husband, a Syrian promagistrate named Gessius Marcianus from Arca Caesarea (Arqa in Lebanon). She may have had a son named Marcus Julius Gessius Bassianus and a daughter named Theoclia with him.

When her cousin, emperor Caracalla, was killed near Carrhae, Macrinus proclaimed himself emperor. Mamaea's mother Maesa and sister Soaemias organized a revolt against Macrinus to declare Soaemias' son, Varius Avitus Bassianus (Elagabalus), as emperor. As a response, Macrinus's camp killed a number of individuals with connections to Elagabalus, including Mamaea's husband Gessius, around 218. Julia provided education of her son Alexander, before his becoming emperor of Rome. Alexander thought much of his mother's advice and followed what she told him to do.

== Reign of Elagabalus (218-222) ==
As a member of the imperial Roman family, under the authority of her aunt Julia Domna, she closely watched the death of her cousin Caracalla and the ascension of her nephew Elagabalus: the oldest grandson of Julia Maesa and initially, her favorite. When Elagabalus successfully overthrew Macrinus and reigned as emperor, Mamaea and her son are described as being present at the imperial court, where her mother Julia Maesa and sister Julia Soaemias, the mother of Elagabalus, also lived. Due to his unorthodox behavior, Elagabalus and Julia Soaemias alienated the Praetorian Guard and their favor instead fell on Alexander, Mamaea's son. Mamaea distributed gold to the Praetorians to usher up support for her son, and guarded him against plots devised by the increasingly desperate Elagabalus. Elagabalus' continued machinations against Alexander spurred Praetorians to murder Elagabalus, and Alexander became emperor in 222.

== The reign of Alexander ==
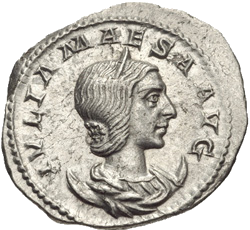
Antoninianus of Julia Maesa

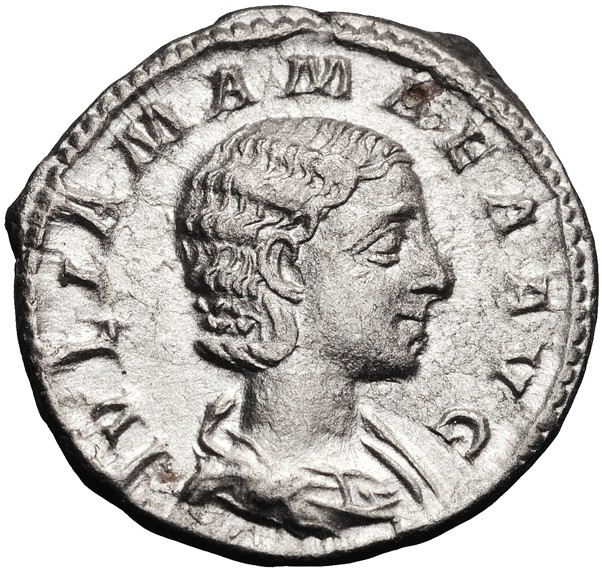
Antoninianus of Julia Mamaea

Julia Mamaea and her mother Maesa played an instrumental role in the imperial accession of Alexander, then 13 years old, by securing the Praetorians' loyalty to him. They remained influential figures during his reign. Julia Mamaea attained the title Augusta immediately following his acquisition of the throne. When Maesa died in 224, Mamaea took over the state affairs alongside an advisory board.

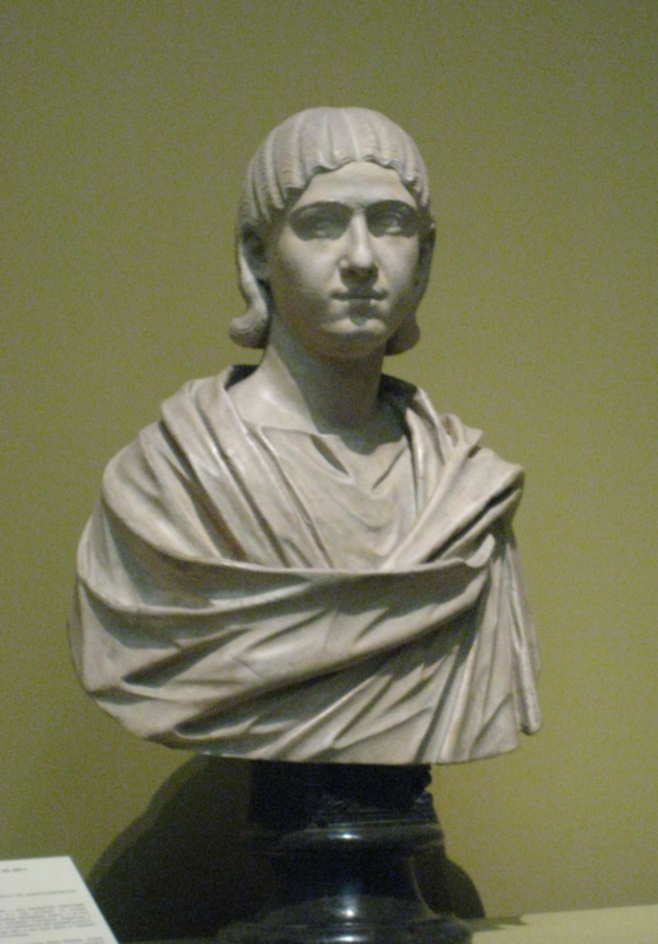
Bust of Julia Mamaea, Pushkin Museum

The two women had collaborated in choosing 16 distinguished senators to form this advisory board and relied heavily on the lawyer Ulpian, who was also from Syria. This created a court environment in which the advisory board ran the Roman Empire with Alexander as the mere figurehead. The new regime garnered the approval of surviving historical sources for overturning Elagabalus' measures and reinstating a more traditional form of government. Ulpian, who held influence during Alexander's early reign, was made head of the Praetorian Guard. However, he was unable to control the Praetorians, who eventually rebelled. Despite the swift flight to the palace under the protection of Julia Mamaea and Severus Alexander, Ulpian was murdered around 223 or 228.

Upon reaching adulthood, Alexander confirmed his esteem for his mother and listened to her advice. She accompanied her son in his campaigns, and like her aunt Julia Domna, she too held many titles in addition to Augusta: mater augusti nostri et castrorum et senatus et patriae ("mother of the emperor, the camp, the senate and the country") and mater universi generis humani ("mother of all the humanity"). The historian Herodian and text Historia Augusta characterize Alexander as a mama's boy who never managed to escape her maternal domination but that he resented her love of money. Mamaea's influence over him led some sources to call him Alexander Mamaeae. Though she was credited with her son's principled upbringing and the stability during his early reign, the army and ancient historians attributed Alexander's military shortcomings to Mamaea. By preventing his exposure to battles as a protective measure, Mamaea may have contributed to her son's deteriorating relationship with the army.

According to Herodian, Mamaea had become jealous of her daughter-in-law, Sallustia Orbiana, whom Alexander married in 225, and whose father Seius Sallustius had been possibly made caesar, because she disapproved that there was another Augusta. In epigraphical dedications, Mamaea was systematically given precedence over Orbiana. Herodian writes Julia Mamaea had Orbiana expelled from the palace and had her father executed, against the will of Alexander Severus, because his mother had too much influence over him and he obeyed all her orders. However, the same historian conflictingly credits Mamaea for selecting Orbiana as an Augusta. The downfall of Orbiana's father, a result of his hostile relation with Mamaea, and the murder of Ulpian are two episodes which demonstrate the prevalence of political intrigues in Alexander's early reign.

Mamaea called on Origen, the Alexandrian Christian leader, to provide her with instructions in Christian doctrine.

== Death ==
After an inconclusive expedition to repel a Persian invasion in 232, Julia Mamaea and Alexander went north to deal with a German attack. Alexander alienated the Rhine legions by his lack of military prowess and his inflexibility towards pay demands, leading to the troops proclaiming Maximinus Thrax emperor in 235. The army also blamed Mamaea for Alexander's passiveness and stinginess. On March 21, troops sent to kill Alexander found him clinging to Mamaea in a tent, where he is said to have been blaming her for his upcoming death. The mother and son were murdered together, ending the Severan dynasty. The following regime placed them under damnatio memoriae.

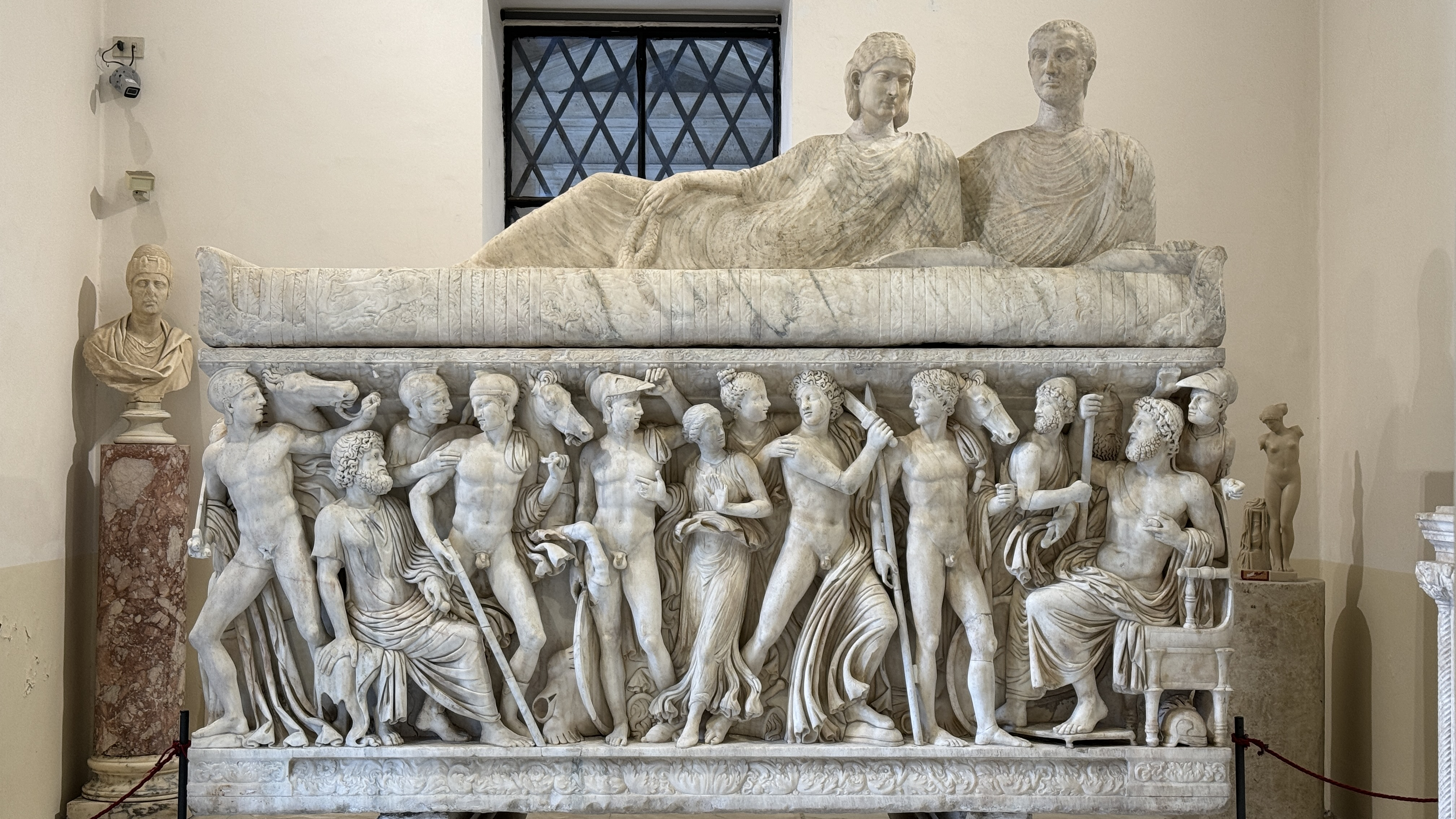
Sarcophagus found in the Monte Del Grano

A sarcophagus was found within the Monte Del Grano by excavators, and later installed in 1590 to the courtyard of the Palazzo Dei Conservatori. While this was considered to be that of Mamaea and Alexander in older traditions, this identification has been doubted, as the representation of the sculptural figures follows the conventions of a married couple. Today, the sarcophagus can be found in the Capitoline Museums in Rome.

== Severan dynasty family tree ==
Severan family tree

Septimius Macer
Gaius Claudius Septimius Aper	Fulvius Pius	Lucius Septimius Severus
Publius Septimius Aper	Gaius Septimius Aper	Fulvia Pia	Publius Septimius Geta	Septimia Polla	Julius Bassianus
Septimius	Publius Septimius Geta	Septimia Octavilla	Paccia Marciana (1)	Septimius Severus (r. 193–211)	Julia Domna (2)	Julia Maesa	Gaius Julius Avitus Alexianus
Gaius Septimius Severus Aper	Fulvia Plautilla	Caracalla (r. 197–217)	Geta (r. 209–211)	Julia Soaemias	Sextus Varius Marcellus	Julia Avita Mamaea	Unknown (2)
Julia Cornelia Paula (1)	Aquilia Severa (2 and 4)	Elagabalus (r. 218–222)	Annia Faustina (3)	Sallustia Orbiana	Severus Alexander (r. 222–235)

- (1) = 1st spouse
- (2) = 2nd spouse
- (3) = 3rd spouse
- (4) = 4th spouse
- Dark green indicates an emperor of the Severan dynasty

Notes:

Except where otherwise noted, the notes below indicate that an individual's parentage is as shown in the above family tree.

Bibliography:

- Birley, Anthony R. (1999). Septimius Severus: The African Emperor. London: Routledge. ISBN 0415165911.
- Gibbon, Edward; Smith, William (1889). The Student's Gibbon: The Decline and Fall of the Roman Empire. London: Murray. OCLC 993285639.

== See also ==
- Women in Ancient Rome
- Severan dynasty family tree
