= Marcus Julius Gessius Bassianus =

3rd century Roman nobleman and member of the Arval brethren

Marcus Julius Gessius Bassianus (flourished 3rd century) was a Magister (master) in the Arval Brethren during the reign of Roman emperor Caracalla who ruled from 212 until 217.

Bassianus seems to be linked to the Julii and the Bassiani. From his name, could point to him as a possible son of the Syrian Roman nobles Gessius Marcianus and Julia Avita Mamaea, being a possible brother of Roman emperor Alexander Severus and his sister, Theoclia. If this is correct, Bassianus was a relation to the Royal family of Emesa and the Severan dynasty of the Roman Empire. He may then have been born about 190, first son of his very freshly married parents.

Bassianus was not a known Priest of the cult of Elagabalus. Although he was a Roman Priest, was unable to attend the ceremonies of the Arval Brethren in Rome, probably due to Bassianus being based in the East.

== Sources ==
- Augustan History, "The Two Maximini"
- A.R. Birley, Septimius Severus: The African Emperor, Routledge, 2002
- L. de Arrizabalaga y Prado, The Emperor Elagabalus: Fact or Fiction?, Cambridge University Press, 2010
