= Gaius Julius Avitus Alexianus =

Syrian-born Roman military commander, senator and governor (c. 155-217)

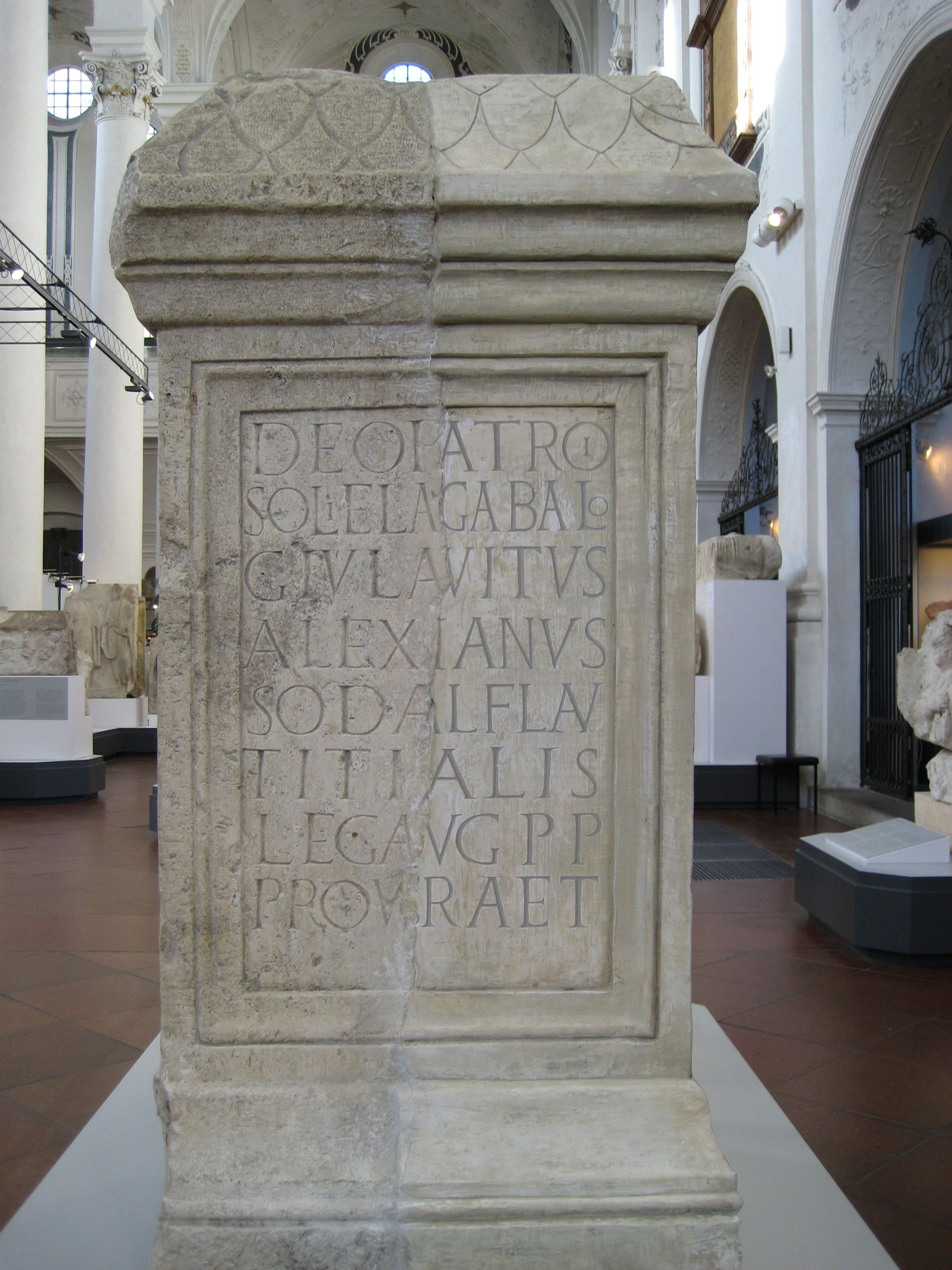
Altar of Elagabalus, dedicated by Gaius Iulius Avitus Alexianus

Gaius Julius Avitus Alexianus (died 217) was a Roman nobleman of Syria and held high military and political commands.

== Background and career ==
Although Alexianus was a Roman citizen who was born and raised in Emesa (modern Homs, Syria), little is known on his origins. It has been assumed that Alexianus was born in c. 155. What is known about him is from surviving inscriptional and Roman historical evidence. Through marriage he was a relation to the Royal family of Emesa and the ruling Severan dynasty of the Roman Empire.

He was an Equestrian officer serving as a praefectus and tribune in the Roman military, and then as a procurator of the food supply in Rome, being stationed in Ostia.

Later he was promoted to the Senate by the Emperor Septimius Severus, his brother-in-law. Having entered the Senate with the rank of Praetor in 194, Alexianus was made Legatus in the Legio IV Flavia Felix and later served as governor of Raetia, which may be dated to 196/197. During his proconsulship of Raetia, he dedicated an altar to the Emesene God Elagabalus. The altar and its inscription, still intact, mentions him as a priest of the deified Emperor Titus.

Alexianus served as consul in 200, even perhaps as early as 198 or 199. After his consulship, Alexianus was not appointed to further military or political positions, probably due to the enmity of the Praetorian prefect Gaius Fulvius Plautianus. After the death of Plautianus in 205, Alexianus took part in Septimius Severus’ expedition in Britain where he acted as a Comes (Companion) to the emperor from 208 until 211.

Under Septimius Severus’ successor Caracalla, for two years Alexianus served as a Prefect of the Italian orphanages. He served as a Legatus in Dalmatia in c. 214 and later as a Proconsul in Asia and in Mesopotamia. In 216–217, Alexianus became a comes to Caracalla on his campaign against the Parthian Empire. He died from old age on his way to Cyprus, sent there by Caracalla in early 217 to act as an advisor to the Governor.

== Marriage and issue ==
Alexianus married the Syrian noblewoman Julia Maesa, the first daughter of Julius Bassianus, a high priest of the Temple of the Sun. The temple was dedicated to the Syrian Aramaic Sun God El-Gebal (counterpart to the Phoenician Baal) in Emesa. The younger sister of Maesa was Septimius Severus' empress Julia Domna, who was the mother of the emperors Caracalla and Geta.

Maesa bore two distinguished daughters to Alexianus who were born and raised in Syria:

- Julia Soaemias Bassiana (c. 180–222)
- Julia Avita Mamaea (after 180–235)

Among his grandchildren were the emperors Elagabalus and Severus Alexander.

== Severan dynasty family tree ==
Severan family tree

Septimius Macer
Gaius Claudius Septimius Aper	Fulvius Pius	Lucius Septimius Severus
Publius Septimius Aper	Gaius Septimius Aper	Fulvia Pia	Publius Septimius Geta	Septimia Polla	Julius Bassianus
Septimius	Publius Septimius Geta	Septimia Octavilla	Paccia Marciana (1)	Septimius Severus (r. 193–211)	Julia Domna (2)	Julia Maesa	Gaius Julius Avitus Alexianus
Gaius Septimius Severus Aper	Fulvia Plautilla	Caracalla (r. 197–217)	Geta (r. 209–211)	Julia Soaemias	Sextus Varius Marcellus	Julia Avita Mamaea	Unknown (2)
Julia Cornelia Paula (1)	Aquilia Severa (2 and 4)	Elagabalus (r. 218–222)	Annia Faustina (3)	Sallustia Orbiana	Severus Alexander (r. 222–235)

- (1) = 1st spouse
- (2) = 2nd spouse
- (3) = 3rd spouse
- (4) = 4th spouse
- Dark green indicates an emperor of the Severan dynasty

Notes:

Except where otherwise noted, the notes below indicate that an individual's parentage is as shown in the above family tree.

Bibliography:

- Birley, Anthony R. (1999). Septimius Severus: The African Emperor. London: Routledge. ISBN 0415165911.
- Gibbon, Edward; Smith, William (1889). The Student's Gibbon: The Decline and Fall of the Roman Empire. London: Murray. OCLC 993285639.

== Sources ==
- A.R. Birley, Septimius Severus: The African Emperor, Routledge, 2002
- J. Hazel, Who's who in the Roman World, Psychology Press, 2002
- Julius Avitus’ article at ancient library
- Gaius Julius Avitus Alexianus’ article at Livius.org
- Julia Maesa’s article at Livius.org
