= Severus Alexander =

Roman emperor from 222 to 235

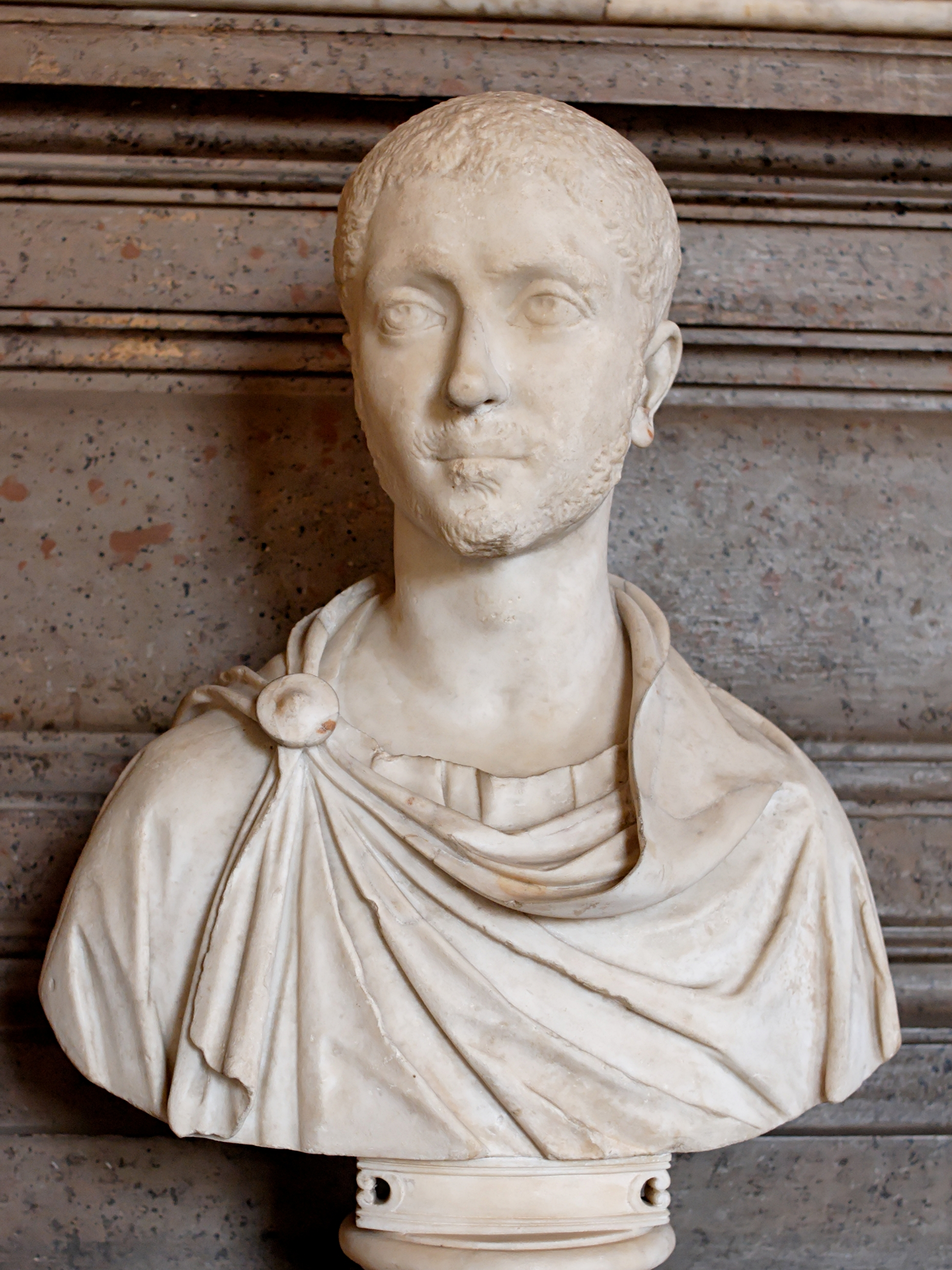
- Bust, Musei Capitolini

Roman emperor
- Reign: 13 March 222 – March 235
- Predecessor: Elagabalus
- Successor: Maximinus Thrax
- Born: Bassianus Alexianus; 1 October 208; Arca Caesarea, Phoenicia (modern Akkar, Lebanon)
- Died: March 235 (aged 26); Moguntiacum, Germania Superior (Mainz, Germany)
- Burial: Monte del Grano
- Spouses: Sallustia Orbiana; Sulpicia Memmia
Names
- Marcus Aurelius Severus Alexander
Regnal name
- Imperator Caesar Marcus Aurelius Severus Alexander Augustus
- Dynasty: Severan
- Father: Uncertain, possibly Gessius Marcianus; Elagabalus (adoptive)
- Mother: Julia Avita Mamaea
- Religion: Roman polytheism-Christianity syncretism (disputed)

Marcus Aurelius Severus Alexander (Note: Severus Alexander, like the other Alexanders who reigned as Roman or Byzantine emperors, is rarely assignated a regnal number. In the cases where he is, he is referred as Alexander I, the other Alexanders being Domitius Alexander as Alexander II and Alexander as Alexander III) (1 October 208 AD – March 235 AD), also known as Alexander Severus, was Roman emperor from 222 until 235 AD. He was the last emperor from the Severan dynasty and, at the age of 13, became the youngest sole emperor of the united Roman Empire.

Alexander became emperor at age 13, succeeding his slain cousin, Emperor Elagabalus as his heir. Alexander and Elagabalus were both grandsons of Julia Maesa, the sister of the empress Julia Domna, who had arranged for Elagabalus's acclamation as emperor by the Third Gallic Legion. Elagabalus had been murdered along with his mother Julia Soaemias by his own guards, who, as a mark of contempt, had the two bodies cast into the Tiber river.

Alexander's 13-year reign was the longest reign of a sole emperor since Antoninus Pius and in peace proved prosperous. However, Rome faced military threats from the rising power of the Sassanid Empire, as well as growing incursions from the tribes of Germania. Alexander managed to check the threat of the Sassanids, but attempted to bring peace by engaging in diplomacy and bribery when campaigning against Germanic tribes. This policy alienated many in the Roman army, leading to a conspiracy that resulted in the assassination of Alexander, along with his mother Julia Avita Mamaea and his advisors. Being succeeded by Maximinus Thrax, Alexander's death constituted the epoch event for the Crisis of the Third Century, bringing in its wake nearly fifty years of civil war, foreign invasion, and the collapse of the monetary economy.

Because of his mother, he was nicknamed Mamaeas (Μαμαίας). He was also referenced in Hebrew sources as Aseverus, son of Antonius.

== Early life ==
Severus Alexander was born on 1 October 208 in Arca Caesarea, Phoenicia. Of his birth name, only two cognomina are known, from literary sources: Bassianus (Ancient Greek: Βασσιανός) according to the historian Cassius Dio, and Alexianus (Ancient Greek: Αλεξιανός) according to Herodian. "Bassianus" was also borne by several family members, while "Alexianus" was probably later converted to Alexander.

The historian Cassius Dio thought Alexianus was the son of Gessius Marcianus, but Icks disputes this, saying Marcianus could not have married the emperor's mother before 212 AD and that Alexianus must have been fathered by his mother's first husband, whose name is unknown but is of certain existence. The priest Marcus Julius Gessius Bassianus may have been his younger brother.

== Emperor ==
=== Early reign ===
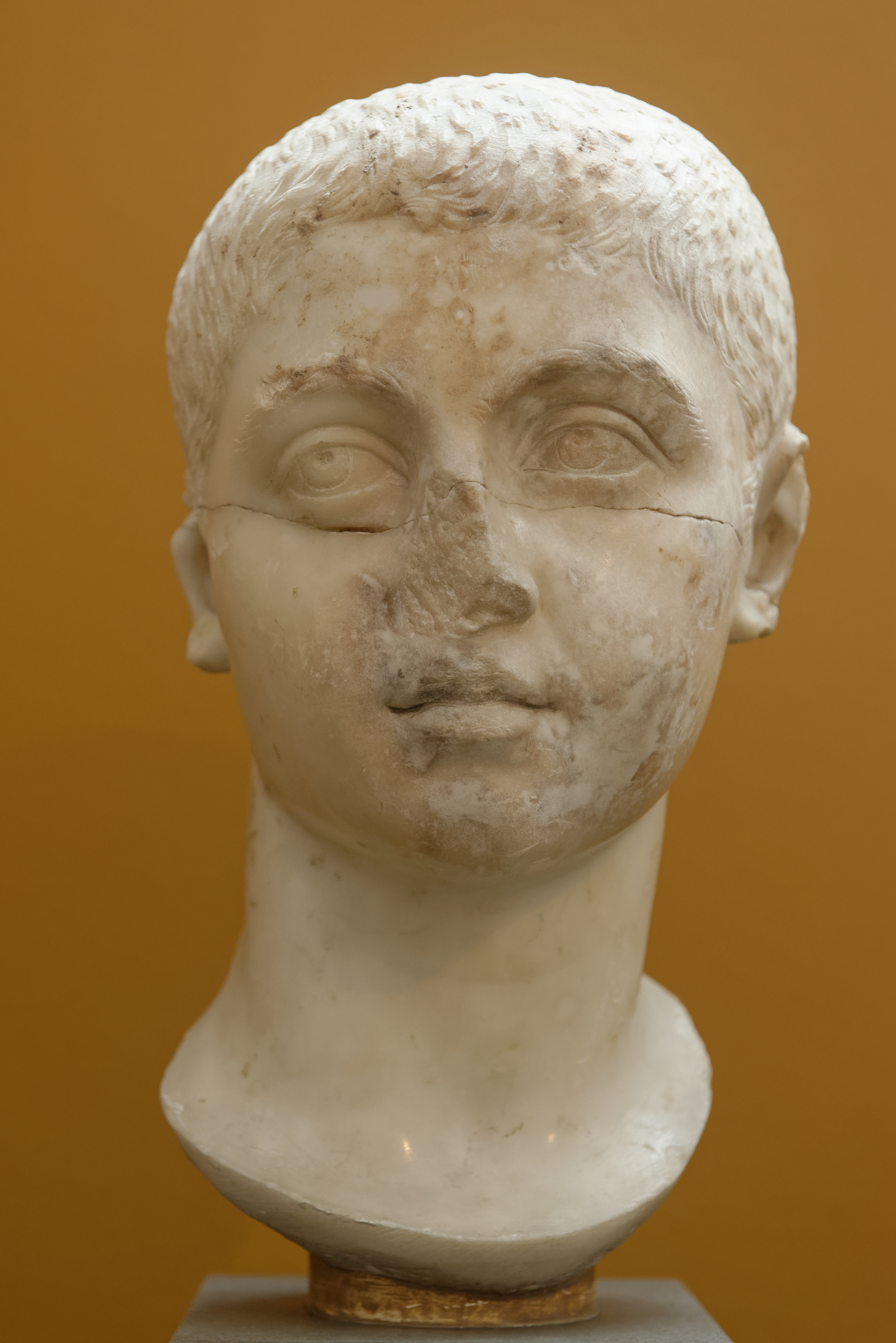
Bust of young Severus Alexander, Ny Carlsberg Glyptotek, Copenhagen

Severus Alexander became emperor when he was around 13 years old, making him the youngest sole Roman emperor, although some historians give that title to Gordian III instead. Alexander appears to have been only a couple of months younger than Gordian at the time of their accession. Alexander's grandmother Maesa believed that he had more potential to rule and gain support from the Praetorian Guard than her other grandson, Elagabalus who was becoming increasingly unpopular. To preserve her own position, she had Elagabalus adopt the young Alexander and then arranged for Elagabalus' assassination, securing the throne for Alexander. The Roman army hailed Alexander as emperor on 13 March 222, and the Senate ratified his acclimation as emperor the following day, conferring on him the titles of Augustus, Pater patriae and Pontifex maximus.

Throughout his life, Alexander relied heavily on guidance from his grandmother, Maesa, before her death in 224, and mother, Julia Mamaea. As a young, immature, and inexperienced adolescent, Alexander knew little about government, warcraft, or the role of ruling over an empire. In time, however, the army came to admire what Jasper Burns refers to as "his simple virtues and moderate behavior, so different from [Elagabalus]".

=== Domestic achievements ===
Under the influence of his mother, Alexander did much to improve the morals and condition of the people, and to enhance the dignity of the state. He employed noted jurists, such as Ulpian, to oversee the administration of justice. His advisers were men like the senator and historian Cassius Dio, and historical sources claimed that with the help of his family, he created a select board of 16 senators, although this claim is sometimes disputed. Some scholars have rejected Herodian's view that Alexander expanded senatorial powers. He also created a municipal council of 14 who assisted the urban prefect in administering the affairs of the 14 districts of Rome. Excessive luxury and extravagance at the imperial court were diminished, and he restored the Baths of Nero in 227 or 229; consequently, they are sometimes also known as the Baths of Alexander after him. He extended the imperial residence at the Horti Lamiani on the Esquiline Hill with elaborate buildings, and created the Nymphaeum of Alexander (known as the Trophies of Marius), which still stands in the Piazza Vittorio Emanuele. This was the great fountain he built at the end of the Aqua Claudia aqueduct.

Upon his accession he reduced the silver purity of the denarius from 46.5% to 43% – the actual silver weight dropped from 1.41 grams to 1.30 grams; however, in 229 he revalued the denarius, increasing the silver purity and weight to 45% and 1.46 grams. The following year he decreased the amount of base metal in the denarius while adding more silver, raising the silver purity and weight again to 50.5% and 1.50 grams. Additionally, during his reign taxes were lightened; literature, art and science were encouraged; and, for the convenience of the people, loan offices were instituted for lending money at a moderate rate of interest.

In religious matters, Alexander preserved an open mind. According to the Historia Augusta, he wished to erect a temple to Jesus but was dissuaded by the pagan priests; however, this claim is unreliable as the Historia Augusta is considered untrustworthy by historians, containing significant amounts of information that is false and even invented, extending to when it was written and the number of authors it was written by. He allowed a synagogue to be built in Rome, and he gave as a gift to this synagogue a scroll of the Torah known as the Severus Scroll.

In legal matters, Alexander did much to aid the rights of his soldiers. He confirmed that soldiers could name anyone as heirs in their will, whereas civilians had strict restrictions over who could become heirs or receive a legacy. He also confirmed that soldiers could free their slaves in their wills, protected the rights of soldiers to their property when they were on campaign, and reasserted that a soldier's property acquired in or because of military service (his castrense peculium) could be claimed by no one else, not even the soldier's father.

=== Military discipline ===
Alexander's reign was also characterized by a significant breakdown of military discipline. In 228, the Praetorian Guard murdered their prefect, Ulpian, in Alexander's presence. Alexander could not openly punish the ringleader of the riot, and instead removed him to a nominal post of honor in Egypt and then Crete, where he was "quietly put out of the way" sometime after the excitement had abated. The soldiers then fought a three-day battle against the populace of Rome, and this battle ended after several parts of the city were set on fire.

Dio was among those who gave a highly critical account of military discipline during the time, saying that the soldiers would rather just surrender to the enemy. Different reasons are given for this issue; Campbell points to

...the decline in the prestige of the Severan dynasty, the feeble nature of Alexander himself, who appeared to be no soldier and to be completely dominated by his mother's advice, and lack of real military success at a time during which the empire was coming under increasing pressure.

Herodian, on the other hand, was convinced that "the emperor's miserliness (partly the result of his mother's greed) and slowness to bestow donatives" were instrumental in the fall of military discipline under Alexander.

=== Persian War ===
On the whole, Alexander's reign was prosperous until the rise of the Sassanids under Ardashir I. In 231 AD, Ardashir invaded the Roman provinces of the east, overrunning Mesopotamia and penetrating possibly as far as Syria and Cappadocia, forcing from the young Alexander a vigorous response. Of the war that followed there are various accounts. According to the most detailed authority, Herodian, the Roman armies suffered a number of humiliating setbacks and defeats, while according to the Historia Augusta as well as Alexander's own dispatch to the Roman Senate, he gained great victories. Making Antioch his base, he organized in 233 a three-fold invasion of the Sassanian Empire; at the head of the main body he himself advanced to recapture northern Mesopotamia, while another army invaded Media through the mountains of Armenia, and a third advanced from the south in the direction of Babylon. The northernmost army gained some success, fighting in mountainous territory favorable to the Roman infantry, but the southern army was surrounded and destroyed by Ardashir's skilful horse-archers, and Alexander himself retreated after an indecisive campaign, his army wracked by indiscipline and disease. Further losses were incurred by the retreating northern army in the inclement cold of Armenia as it retired into winter quarters, due to a failure through incompetence to establish adequate supply lines. Still, Mesopotamia was retaken, and Ardashir was not thereafter able to extend his conquests, though his son, Shapur, would obtain some success later in the century.

Although the Sassanids were checked for the time, the conduct of the Roman army showed an extraordinary lack of discipline. In 232, there was a mutiny in the Syrian legion, which proclaimed Taurinus emperor. Alexander managed to suppress the uprising, and Taurinus drowned while attempting to flee across the Euphrates. The emperor returned to Rome and celebrated a triumph in 233.

=== Germanic War ===
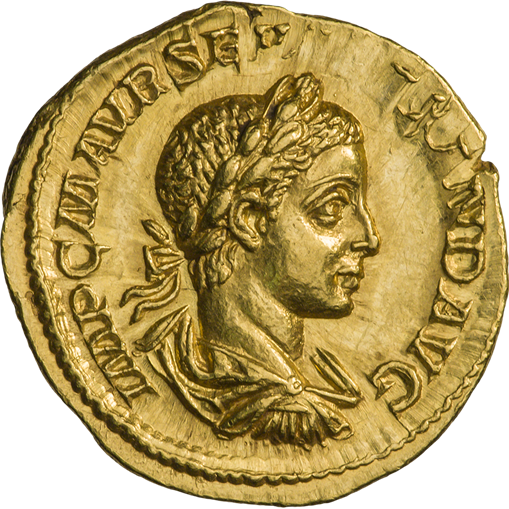
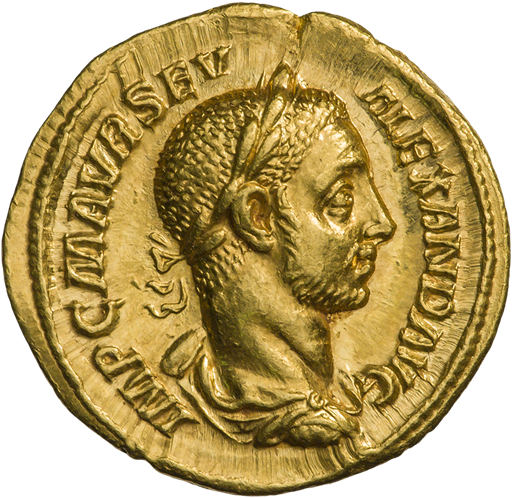
Aurei of Alexander minted in 222 and 228 marked:
IMP. C. M. AUR. SEV. ALEXAND. AVG.

A new and menacing enemy started to emerge directly after Alexander's success in the Persian war. In 234, the barbarians crossed the Rhine and Danube in hordes that caused alarm as far as Rome. The soldiers serving under Alexander, already demoralized after their costly war against the Persians, were further discontented with their emperor when their homes were destroyed by the barbarian invaders.

As word of the invasion spread, the emperor took the front line and went to battle against the Germanic invaders. The Romans prepared heavily for the war, building a fleet to carry the entire army across. However, at this point in Alexander's career, he still knew little about being a general. Because of this, he hoped the mere threat of his armies would be sufficient to persuade the hostile tribes to surrender. Severus enforced a strict military discipline in his men that sparked a rebellion among his legions. Due to incurring heavy losses against the Persians, and on the advice of his mother, Alexander attempted to buy the Germanic tribes off, so as to gain time.

It was this decision that resulted in the legionaries looking down upon Alexander. They considered him dishonorable and feared he was unfit to be Emperor. Under these circumstances the army swiftly looked to replace Alexander.

Gaius Julius Verus Maximinus was the next best option. He was a soldier from Thrace who had a golden reputation and was working hard to increase his military status. He was also a man with superior personal strength, who rose to his present position from a peasant background. With the Thracian's hailing came the end of the Severan Dynasty, and, with the growing animosity of Severus' army towards him, the path for his assassination was paved.

== Assassination ==
Bust of Severus Alexander, Musée Saint-Raymond, Toulouse

Alexander was forced to face his Germanic enemies in the early months of 235. By the time he and his mother arrived, the situation had settled, and so his mother convinced him that to avoid violence, trying to bribe the Germanic army to surrender was the more sensible course of action. According to historians, it was this tactic combined with insubordination from his own men that destroyed his reputation and popularity. Alexander was thus assassinated together with his mother in early March (Note: The reign-length given by ancient writers gives a date of 21–23 March. However, these are reckoning to the formal accession of Maximinus Thrax, which almost certainly took place on 23 March. A travel from Mainz to Rome could take almost a whole month, so his exact date of death is not known.) in a mutiny of the Legio XXII Primigenia at Moguntiacum (Mainz) while at a meeting with his generals. These assassinations secured the throne for Maximinus.

The Historia Augusta documents two theories that elaborate on Severus's assassination. The first claims that the disaffection of Mamaea was the main motive behind the homicide. However, Lampridius makes it clear that he is more supportive of an alternative theory.

This theory has it that, in an open tent after his lunch, Alexander was consulting with his insubordinate troops, who compared him to his cousin Elagabalus, the divisive and unpopular Emperor whose own assassination paved the way for Alexander's reign. A Germanic servant entered the tent and initiated the call for Alexander's assassination, at which point many of the troops joined in the attack. Alexander's attendants fought against the other troops but could not hold off the combined might of those seeking the Emperor's assassination. Within minutes, Alexander was dead. His mother, Julia Mamaea, was in the same tent with Alexander and soon fell victim to the same group of assassins.

Alexander's body is traditionally believed to have been buried together with the body of his mother, Julia Mamaea, in a mausoleum in Rome. The mausoleum, called Monte del Grano is the third largest in Rome after those of Hadrian and Augustus. A large sarcophagus was found inside the tomb in the 16th century, now in the Palazzo dei Conservatori Museum in Rome, was traditionally thought to contain the emperor's remains but this has been disputed and is today considered groundless.

== Legacy ==
Alexander's death marked the end of the Severan dynasty. He was the last of the Syrian emperors and the first emperor to be overthrown by military discontent on a wide scale. After his death his economic policies were completely discarded, and the Roman currency was devalued; this signaled the beginning of the chaotic period known as the Crisis of the Third Century, which brought the empire to the brink of collapse.

Alexander's death at the hands of his troops can also be seen as the heralding of a new role for Roman emperors. Though they were not yet expected to personally fight in battle during Alexander's time, emperors were increasingly expected to display general competence in military affairs. Thus, Alexander's taking of his mother's advice to not get involved in battle, his dishonorable and unsoldierly methods of dealing with the Germanic threat, and the relative failure of his military campaign against the Persians were all deemed highly unacceptable by the soldiers. Indeed, Maximinus was able to overthrow Alexander by "harping on his own military excellence in contrast to that feeble coward". Yet by arrogating the power to dethrone their emperor, the legions paved the way for a half-century of widespread chaos and instability.

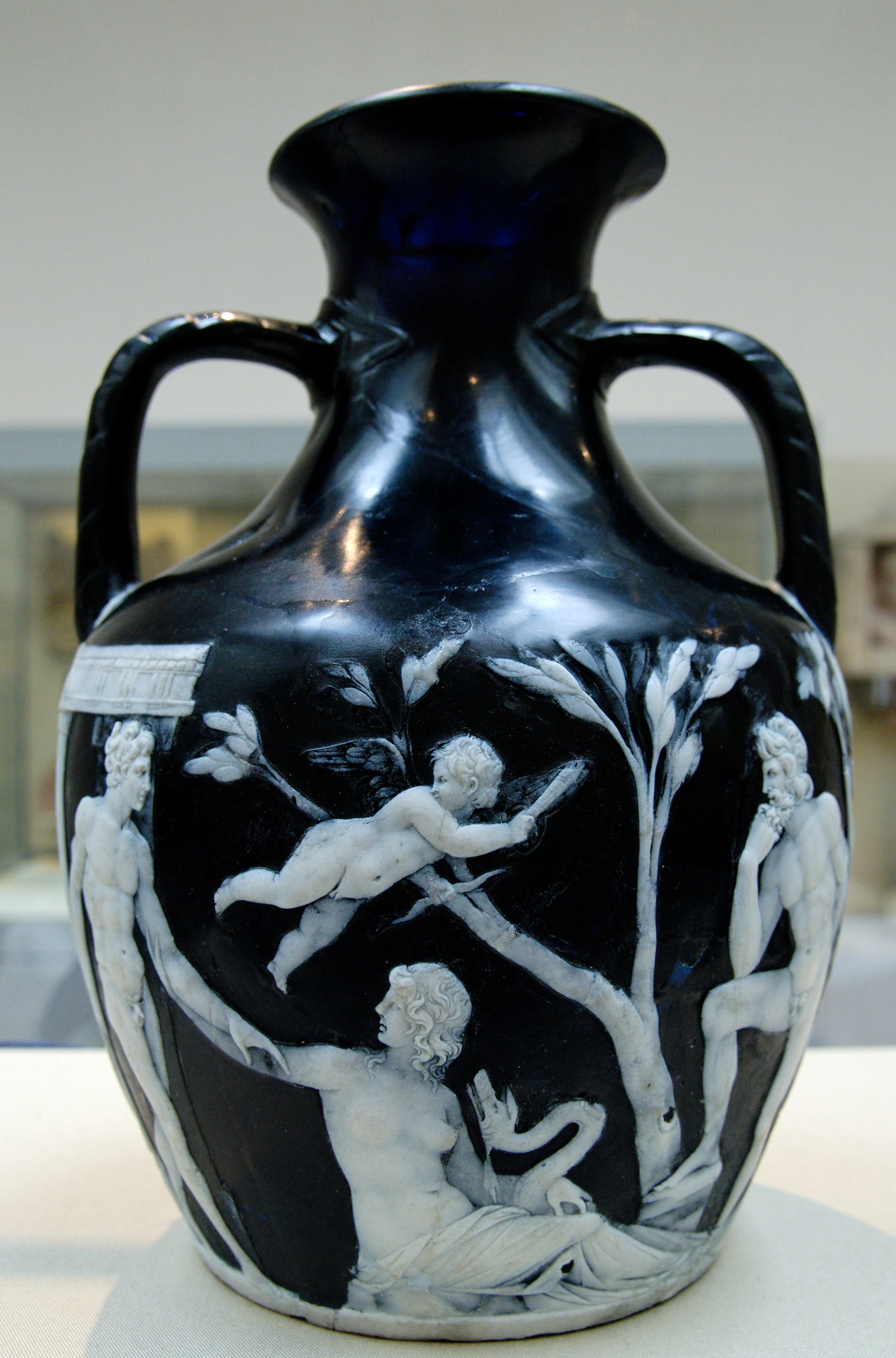
The Portland Vase

Alexander was deified after the death of Maximinus in 238.

=== Portland Vase ===
Perhaps his most tangible legacy was the emergence in the 16th century of the cameo glass Portland Vase (or "Barberini Vase"), dated to around the reign of Augustus. This was allegedly found at the mausoleum of the emperor and his family at Monte Del Grano. The discovery of the vase is described by Pietro Santi Bartoli. Pietro Bartoli indicates that the vase contained the ashes of Severus Alexander. However, there is no definitive proof that it was found at Alexander's sarcophagus and the interpretations of the scenes depicted are the source of many disputed theories. The vase passed through the hands of Sir William Hamilton Ambassador to the Royal Court in Naples, and in 1784 was sold to the Duchess of Portland, and has subsequently been known as the Portland Vase. After an attack by a disturbed man in the British Museum in 1845 smashed it into many fragments, the vase has been reconstructed three times. In 1786 the Portland vase had been borrowed from the 3rd Duke of Portland and copied in black Jasperware pottery by Josiah Wedgwood for his firm Wedgwood. He appears to have added some drapery to cover nudity, but his replicas were useful in the reconstructions.

== Personal life ==
According to the Historia Augusta, Alexander's "chief amusement consisted in having young dogs play with little pigs." Herodian portrays him as a mother's boy.

=== Family ===
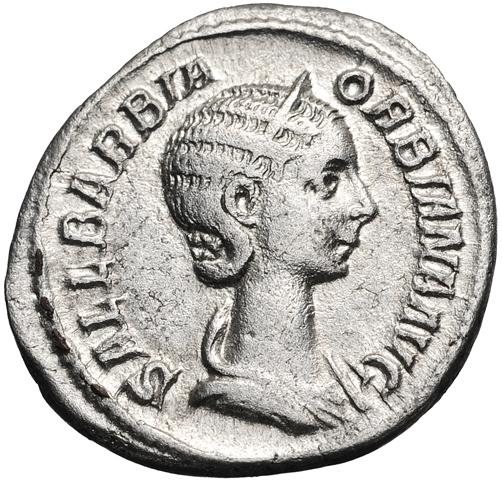
Denarius of Sallustia Orbiana. Inscription: SALL. BARBIA ORBIANA AVG.

Alexander's only known wife was Sallustia Orbiana, Augusta, whom he married in 225 when she was 16 years old. Their marriage was arranged by Alexander's mother, Mamaea. According to historian Herodian, however, as soon as Orbiana received the title of Augusta, Mamaea became increasingly jealous and resentful of Alexander's wife due to Mamaea's excessive desire of all regal female titles. Alexander divorced and exiled Orbiana in 227, after her father, Seius Sallustius, was executed after being accused of treason.

According to Historia Augusta, a late Roman work containing biographies of emperors and others, and considered by scholars to be a work of dubious historical reliability, Alexander was also at some point married to Sulpicia Memmia, a member of one of the most ancient Patrician families in Rome and a daughter to a man of consular rank; her grandfather's name was Catulus. She is mentioned as his wife only in this later text, thus the marriage has been questioned.

The ancient historian Zosimus claimed that Alexander was married three times. A man named Varius Macrinus may have been Alexander's father-in-law, but it is uncertain if he was the same man as Seius Sallustius, the father of Memmia or the father of an entirely unknown third wife.

According to some sources, Alexander is not known to have fathered any children. However, the Talmudic figure of Aseverus, son of Antonius was said to have a daughter named Justina, who famously challenged a Rabbi on his teaching that a girl younger than twelve years and one day cannot conceive a pregnancy. She claimed to personally have been married at the age of six and borne a child at the age of seven. Learning from the Rabbi that the earliest legal age for marriage was three years and one day, she said that she regretted the three extra years that she lived as a virgin in her father's house.

=== Christianity ===
He was extremely tolerant of Jews and Christians alike. He continued all privileges towards Jews during his reign. The Historia Augusta, a source considered to be generally unreliable, relates that Alexander placed images of Abraham and Jesus in his oratory, along with other Roman deities and classical figures such as deified emperors, Orpheus and Apollonius of Tyana, and prayed there every morning.

== Severan dynasty family tree ==
Severan family tree

Septimius Macer
Gaius Claudius Septimius Aper	Fulvius Pius	Lucius Septimius Severus
Publius Septimius Aper	Gaius Septimius Aper	Fulvia Pia	Publius Septimius Geta	Septimia Polla	Julius Bassianus
Septimius	Publius Septimius Geta	Septimia Octavilla	Paccia Marciana (1)	Septimius Severus (r. 193–211)	Julia Domna (2)	Julia Maesa	Gaius Julius Avitus Alexianus
Gaius Septimius Severus Aper	Fulvia Plautilla	Caracalla (r. 197–217)	Geta (r. 209–211)	Julia Soaemias	Sextus Varius Marcellus	Julia Avita Mamaea	Unknown (2)
Julia Cornelia Paula (1)	Aquilia Severa (2 and 4)	Elagabalus (r. 218–222)	Annia Faustina (3)	Sallustia Orbiana	Severus Alexander (r. 222–235)

- (1) = 1st spouse
- (2) = 2nd spouse
- (3) = 3rd spouse
- (4) = 4th spouse
- Dark green indicates an emperor of the Severan dynasty

Notes:

Except where otherwise noted, the notes below indicate that an individual's parentage is as shown in the above family tree.

Bibliography:

- Birley, Anthony R. (1999). Septimius Severus: The African Emperor. London: Routledge. ISBN 0415165911.
- Gibbon, Edward; Smith, William (1889). The Student's Gibbon: The Decline and Fall of the Roman Empire. London: Murray. OCLC 993285639.

== See also ==
- Severan dynasty family tree
- Sassanid campaign of Severus Alexander
- Mesopotamian campaigns of Ardashir I

== Notes ==
Severus Alexander Severan dynasty Born: 1 October 208 Died: March 235
Regnal titles
Preceded by Elagabalus	Roman emperor 222–235	Succeeded by Maximinus Thrax
Political offices
Preceded by G. Vettius Gratus Sabinianus; M. Flavius Vitellius Seleucus	Roman consul 222 with Elagabalus	Succeeded by Marius Maximus; L. Roscius Aelianus Paculus Salvius Julianus
Preceded by Ti. Manilius Fuscus; Ser. Calpurnius Domitius Dexter	Roman consul 226 with Gaius Aufidius Marcellus	Succeeded by M. Nummius Senecio Albinus; M. Laelius Fulvius Maximus Aemilianus
Preceded by Q. Aiacius Modestus Crescentianus; M. Pomponius Maecius Probus	Roman consul 229 with Cassius Dio	Succeeded by Lucius Virius Agricola; Sex. Catius Clementinus Priscillianus
