= Sextus Varius Marcellus =

Syrian-born Roman nobleman and politician (c. 165 – c. 215)

Sextus Varius Marcellus (c. 165 – c. 215) was a Roman aristocrat and politician from the province of Syria. He was the legal father of the emperor Elagabalus.

== Family and career ==
Little is known about the origins of Marcellus, other than he was born and raised in the city of Apamea in Syria. Marcellus was a Roman citizen from the Equestrian order.

Marcellus had a long and distinguished political career. He was present at the Secular Games in Rome in 204. From 200 to 205, like Gaius Julius Avitus Alexianus, Marcellus did not serve in a significant Roman military or political position, probably due to Roman emperor Lucius Septimius Severus views about him being influenced by the Praetorian prefect Gaius Fulvius Plautianus. When Plautianus was killed in 205, Marcellus' career was able to move ahead.

From 205 to about 207, Marcellus was a Procurator for the Roman aqueducts in Rome, a position usually given to Romans of Senatorial rank, not from the Equestrian class. Marcellus was paid about 100,000 sesterces per year.

Marcellus proved his worth and capabilities in his position to Emperor Severus and his family. In 208 the emperor promoted him to Procurator of Roman Britain and in this position he was responsible for gathering taxes for Rome. He earned 200,000 sesterces in this role. Later he was promoted by the emperor to managing the finances of Roman Britain earning 300,000 sesterces.

In 211 after the death of Lucius Septimius Severus, his sons Caracalla and Publius Septimius Geta succeeded their father on the Roman throne. Caracalla recalled Marcellus from Roman Britain to Rome and briefly placed him in the roles of Praefectus urbi and Praetorian prefect. He was later admitted into the Senate and, soon after, became praefectus of the military treasury. He later became governor of Numidia and held this post until his death.

== Marriage and children ==
Marcellus married the Syrian Roman noblewoman Julia Soaemias Bassiana who was the first daughter of the powerful Syrian nobles Julia Maesa and Gaius Julius Avitus Alexianus. The maternal aunt of Soaemias was the Roman empress Julia Domna; her maternal uncle-in-marriage was the Roman emperor Lucius Septimius Severus; her maternal cousins were the Roman emperors Caracalla and Publius Septimius Geta and she was the maternal aunt of the Roman emperor Alexander Severus. Through marriage, Marcellus was related both to the Severan dynasty of the Roman Empire and the royal family of Emesa, Syria. Their marriage may have taken place in 192 or 194, or even perhaps around 200. Marcellus and Soaemias' marriage may have been arranged to strengthen Lucius Septimius Severus' position in the Roman East. Based on epigraphical evidence it is known that the couple had at least two children, but only one of them is known, Varius Avitus Bassianus, who became the Severan Roman emperor Elagabalus from 218 until 222. However, the family would later claim that Caracalla, not Marcellus, was the boy's biological father.

== Epigraphic evidence ==
Inscriptional evidence has survived on Marcellus. After his death in c. 215, his wife Julia Soaemias Bassiana and their two sons, dedicated to him a tombstone which was found in Velletri, not far from Rome. The tombstone has two preserved bilingual inscriptions in Latin and Greek, which were first published at Rome in 1765. The inscriptions reveal his political career, his various titles, designations and distinctions he received. The tombstone of Marcellus is known to scholars as CIL X, 6569 which can be found in the Octagonal Court in the Vatican Museums and reads:

To Sextus Varius Marcellus
procurator centenarius of the water supply, procurator ducenarius of Britain, procurator
trecenarius of the private purse, acting as praetorian prefect and praefectus urbi,
senator, prefect of the military treasury, commander of the Third legion Augusta,
governor of Numidia,
has Julia Soaemias Bassiana, daughter of Gaius, with her children,
[dedicated this] to her husband and dearest father.

Marcellus was known in dedicating an inscription to Bel in Vasio (Vaison) in Gaul. The bilingual inscription which is in Greek and Latin on an altar, dedicated by him is honoring Bel in remembrance of the oracles given to him in Apamea.

== Posthumous honour ==
The Baths of Varius (Thermae Varianae) in Rome were named in honor of Marcellus and his second son by the Legio XIII Gemina.

The Circus Varianus was also named after his family.

== Severan dynasty family tree ==
Severan family tree

Septimius Macer
Gaius Claudius Septimius Aper	Fulvius Pius	Lucius Septimius Severus
Publius Septimius Aper	Gaius Septimius Aper	Fulvia Pia	Publius Septimius Geta	Septimia Polla	Julius Bassianus
Septimius	Publius Septimius Geta	Septimia Octavilla	Paccia Marciana (1)	Septimius Severus (r. 193–211)	Julia Domna (2)	Julia Maesa	Gaius Julius Avitus Alexianus
Gaius Septimius Severus Aper	Fulvia Plautilla	Caracalla (r. 197–217)	Geta (r. 209–211)	Julia Soaemias	Sextus Varius Marcellus	Julia Avita Mamaea	Unknown (2)
Julia Cornelia Paula (1)	Aquilia Severa (2 and 4)	Elagabalus (r. 218–222)	Annia Faustina (3)	Sallustia Orbiana	Severus Alexander (r. 222–235)

- (1) = 1st spouse
- (2) = 2nd spouse
- (3) = 3rd spouse
- (4) = 4th spouse
- Dark green indicates an emperor of the Severan dynasty

Notes:

Except where otherwise noted, the notes below indicate that an individual's parentage is as shown in the above family tree.

Bibliography:

- Birley, Anthony R. (1999). Septimius Severus: The African Emperor. London: Routledge. ISBN 0415165911.
- Gibbon, Edward; Smith, William (1889). The Student's Gibbon: The Decline and Fall of the Roman Empire. London: Murray. OCLC 993285639.

== Sources ==
- F. Millar, The Roman Near East: 31 BC-AD 337, Harvard University Press, 1993
- J. Hazel, Who's Who in the Roman World, Psychology Press, 2002
- A.R. Birley, Septimius Severus: The African Emperor, Routledge, 2002
- T. Bioy, Late Achaemenid and Hellenistic Babylon, Peeters Publishers, 2004
- B. Levick, Julia Domna: Syrian Empress, Routledge, 2007
- M. Bunsen, Encyclopedia of the Roman Empire, Infobase Printing, 2009
- L. de Arrizabalaga y Prado, The Emperor Elagabalus: Fact or Fiction?, Cambridge University Press, 2010
