= Seius Sallustius =

Roman imperial usurper (died 227)

Lucius Seius Herennius Sallustius (died 227 AD) was an influential senator, the father-in-law to Severus Alexander. He was said to have been a Roman usurper.

Sallustius was the grandson of Publius Seius Fuscianus, a childhood friend of Marcus Aurelius and later a consul. Little is known of Sallustius' senatorial career. In 225, his daughter, Sallustia Orbiana, was wed to emperor Severus Alexander, and Sallustius was said to have been raised to the rank of Caesar thereafter.

By 227, however, he was accused of making an attempt on the life of his son-in-law. As a result, he was executed, and his daughter was banished to Libya.
