= Sallustia Orbiana =

Roman empress and consort of Severus Alexander

- Augusta
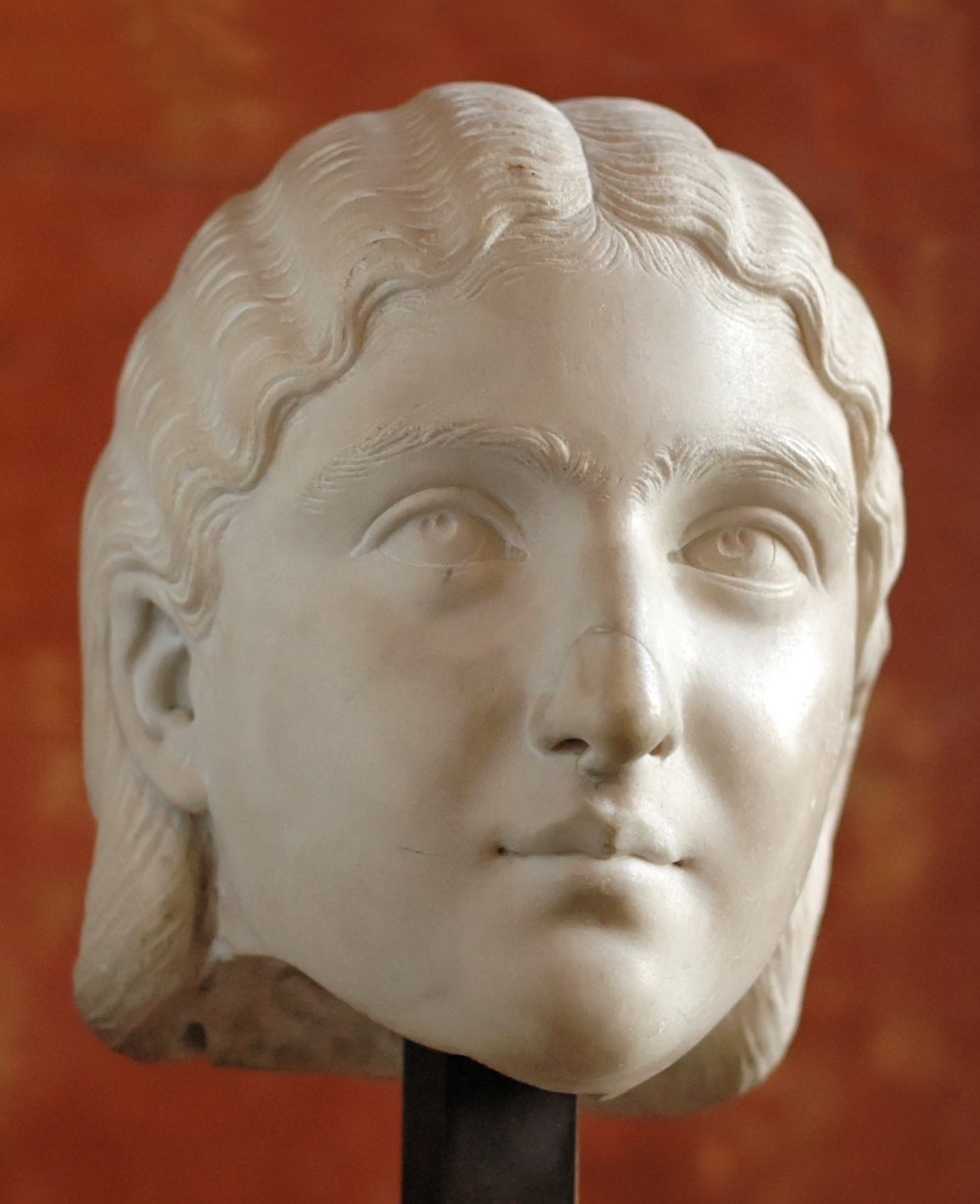
- Marble head of Orbiana.

Empress of the Roman Empire
- Tenure: 225–227
- Born: c. 209
- Spouse: Emperor Severus Alexander
Names
- Gnaea Seia Herennia Sallustia Barbia Orbiana

Gnaea Seia Herennia Sallustia Barbia Orbiana (fl. 220s), usually known as Sallustia Orbiana, was a third century Roman empress, with the title of Augusta as the wife of Severus Alexander from AD 225 to 227. The emperor married her in late 225, following the death of his grandmother. Severus was around sixteen years of age at this time. She was known for her beauty, which was captured in multiple works of art. Possibly a victim of the jealousy of Julia Mamaea, the emperor's mother, Orbiana was divorced and exiled to Libya in 227.

== Life ==
Orbiana was the daughter of Lucius Seius Herennius Sallustius, an influential Roman senator, in the early third century. In August, 225, at about the age of sixteen, she wed the Roman emperor Severus Alexander, in an arrangement organized by the emperor's mother, Julia Avita Mamaea. Their union was short in duration and childless and it ended in August 227. Sallustius was proclaimed Caesar, and by the end of August, 227, Orbiana was granted the title of Augusta. According to Herodian, Mamaea became jealous of Orbiana, due to her desire to be sole Augusta. She treated Orbiana cruelly, forcing her to take refuge with her father.

Finding Mamaea's abuse unendurable, Sallustius sought the protection of the Praetorian Guard, or the intervention of the emperor. Alexander was fond of Orbiana, but being reliant on his mother, he failed to take any action in defense of his wife or her father. Herodian further alleges that Sallustius was put to death in August of 227 through the schemes of Mamaea, on the pretext that he wished to use the Praetorian Guard to seize power for himself. Orbiana was stripped of her title, divorced, and exiled to the province of Libya in north Africa. Nothing further is known of her. Severus Alexander reigned for another eight years. He and his mother were slain in a mutiny in 235, clearing the way for the succession of Maximinus Thrax, and ending the Severan dynasty.

== Depictions ==
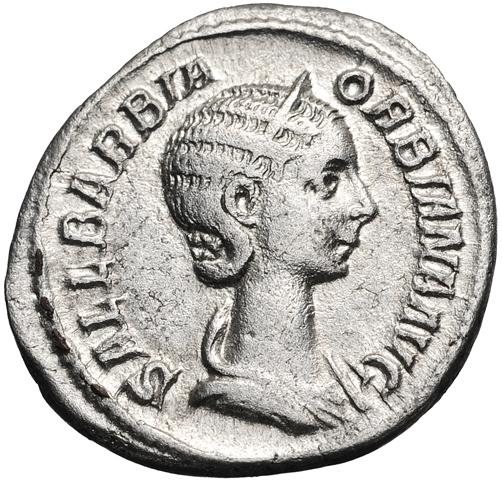
Denarius of Orbiana.

Besides a limited emission of coinage in bronze and silver, several Roman gold coins were minted with Orbiana's visage. She was the only wife of Severus to be featured on coins. Careful attention was paid to the coinage of copper money during the reign of Severus. Following his reign, the art and undiluted quality of money declined.

== Severan dynasty family tree ==
Severan family tree

Septimius Macer
Gaius Claudius Septimius Aper	Fulvius Pius	Lucius Septimius Severus
Publius Septimius Aper	Gaius Septimius Aper	Fulvia Pia	Publius Septimius Geta	Septimia Polla	Julius Bassianus
Septimius	Publius Septimius Geta	Septimia Octavilla	Paccia Marciana (1)	Septimius Severus (r. 193–211)	Julia Domna (2)	Julia Maesa	Gaius Julius Avitus Alexianus
Gaius Septimius Severus Aper	Fulvia Plautilla	Caracalla (r. 197–217)	Geta (r. 209–211)	Julia Soaemias	Sextus Varius Marcellus	Julia Avita Mamaea	Unknown (2)
Julia Cornelia Paula (1)	Aquilia Severa (2 and 4)	Elagabalus (r. 218–222)	Annia Faustina (3)	Sallustia Orbiana	Severus Alexander (r. 222–235)

- (1) = 1st spouse
- (2) = 2nd spouse
- (3) = 3rd spouse
- (4) = 4th spouse
- Dark green indicates an emperor of the Severan dynasty

Notes:

Except where otherwise noted, the notes below indicate that an individual's parentage is as shown in the above family tree.

Bibliography:

- Birley, Anthony R. (1999). Septimius Severus: The African Emperor. London: Routledge. ISBN 0415165911.
- Gibbon, Edward; Smith, William (1889). The Student's Gibbon: The Decline and Fall of the Roman Empire. London: Murray. OCLC 993285639.

== Cultural references ==
Sallustia Orbiana is a character in Alessandro Severo (1716), an opera seria libretto by Apostolo Zeno. This was later adapted as La Salustia (1732), set to music by Giovanni Battista Pergolesi.

== Bibliography ==
- Herodianus, Tes Meta Marcon Basileas Istoria (History of the Empire from the Death of Marcus Aurelius).
- Joannes Zonaras, Epitome Historiarum (Epitome of History), Thomas Banchich, Eugene Lane, eds., Routledge (2009).
- Museo Vaticano (1846).
- Theodor Mommsen et alii, Corpus Inscriptionum Latinarum (The Body of Latin Inscriptions, abbreviated CIL), Berlin-Brandenburgische Akademie der Wissenschaften (1853–present).
- Sir Richard V. N. Hopkins, The Life of Severus Alexander, University Press (1907).
- Stéphane Gsell, Inscriptions Latines de L'Algérie (Latin Inscriptions from Algeria), Edouard Champion, Paris (1922–present).
- Rodolfo Lanciani, Wandering Through Ancient Roman Churches, Kessinger Publishing (1924, 2003).
- David L. Vagi, Coinage and History of the Roman Empire, c. 82 B.C.–A.D. 480: Coinage, Taylor & Francis (2000).
- Roger M. Kean, Oliver Frey, The Complete Chronicle of the Emperors of Rome, Thalamus (2005).

Royal titles
Preceded by Aquilia Severa	Empress of Rome; 225–227	Succeeded by Caecilia Paulina
