= Fulvia Plautilla =

Roman empress from 202 to 205

- Augusta
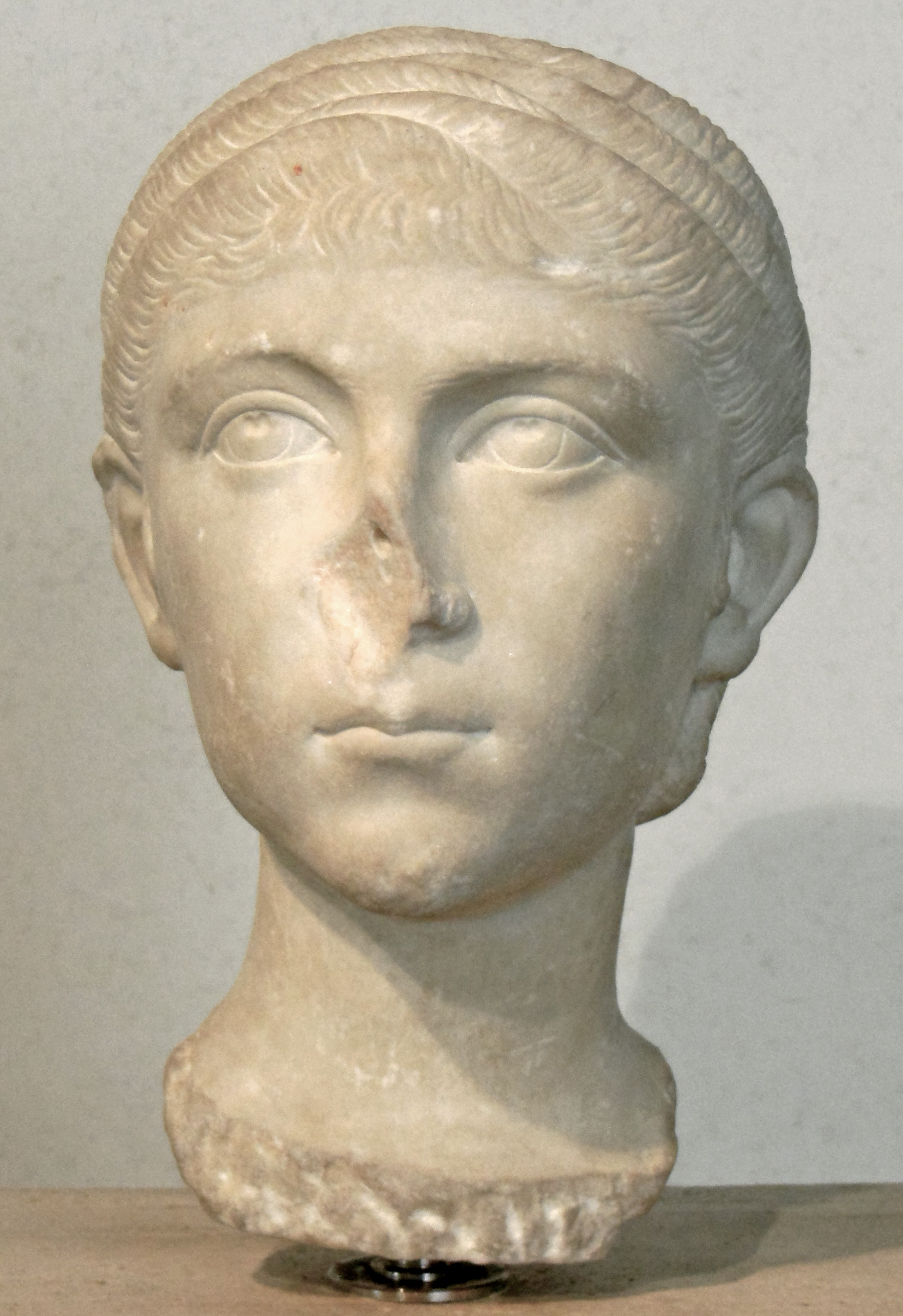
- Bust of Plautilla, Museo Nazionale Romano.

Roman empress
- Tenure: 202–205 (with Julia Domna)
- Died: 211; Lipari
- Spouse: Caracalla
- Issue: possible daughter
Names
- Publia Fulvia Plautilla
Regnal name
- Publia Fulvia Plautilla Augusta
- Father: Gaius Fulvius Plautianus
- Mother: Hortensia

Publia Fulvia Plautilla (died 211) was the wife of the Roman emperor Caracalla, her paternal second cousin. After her father was condemned for treason, she was exiled and eventually killed, possibly on Caracalla's orders.

== Life ==
Plautilla was born and raised in Rome. She belonged to the gens Fulvia of ancient Rome. The Fulvius family was of plebeian origin, came from Tusculum, Italy and had been active in politics since the Roman Republic. Plautilla's father, however, came from the Leptis Magna, in North Africa (located in modern-day Libya).

Her mother was named Hortensia; her father was Gaius Fulvius Plautianus, the Commander of the Praetorian Guard, consul, paternal first cousin and close ally to Roman Emperor Lucius Septimius Severus (the father of Caracalla). She also had a brother, Gaius Fulvius Plautius Hortensianus.

Severus and Plautianus arranged for Plautilla to be married to Severus' son and heir, Caracalla, in a lavish ceremony in April 202 CE. The forced marriage proved to be very unhappy; Caracalla despised her. According to Cassius Dio, Plautilla had a profligate character; however, scholars view this as most likely being a claim driven by propaganda.

Numismatic evidence may indicate that Plautilla and Caracalla had a daughter, whose name is unknown, in 204. Anthony Birley notes that these coins "may indicate no more than pious hopes" and doubts that the marriage was consummated.

In the same year, her father-in-law ordered the erection of the Arch of Septimius Severus, honoring him and his family, including his wife, Empress Julia Domna, Caracalla, Plautilla and her brother-in-law Publius Septimius Geta.

Fulvia Plautilla

On 22 January 205 Gaius Fulvius Plautianus was executed for treachery and his family properties were confiscated. Plautilla and her brother were exiled by Caracalla to Sicily and then to Lipari. They were treated very harshly and were eventually strangled, possibly on Caracalla's orders after the death of Septimius Severus on 4 February 211.

== Contemporary depictions ==
Coins bearing her image that have survived are mainly from the reign of her father-in-law. They are inscribed Plautilla Augusta or Plautillae Augustae.

A marble bust of Fulvia Plautilla is in the Louvre.

The Solinjanka or Salonitanka, meaning "woman from the city of Solin (ancient Salona)", one of the most important Roman portraits found in Croatia, is believed to depict Plautilla at a young age. Originally found in Salona, it is now kept in the Archaeological museum in Zagreb.

== Severan dynasty family tree ==
Severan family tree

Septimius Macer
Gaius Claudius Septimius Aper	Fulvius Pius	Lucius Septimius Severus
Publius Septimius Aper	Gaius Septimius Aper	Fulvia Pia	Publius Septimius Geta	Septimia Polla	Julius Bassianus
Septimius	Publius Septimius Geta	Septimia Octavilla	Paccia Marciana (1)	Septimius Severus (r. 193–211)	Julia Domna (2)	Julia Maesa	Gaius Julius Avitus Alexianus
Gaius Septimius Severus Aper	Fulvia Plautilla	Caracalla (r. 197–217)	Geta (r. 209–211)	Julia Soaemias	Sextus Varius Marcellus	Julia Avita Mamaea	Unknown (2)
Julia Cornelia Paula (1)	Aquilia Severa (2 and 4)	Elagabalus (r. 218–222)	Annia Faustina (3)	Sallustia Orbiana	Severus Alexander (r. 222–235)

- (1) = 1st spouse
- (2) = 2nd spouse
- (3) = 3rd spouse
- (4) = 4th spouse
- Dark green indicates an emperor of the Severan dynasty

Notes:

Except where otherwise noted, the notes below indicate that an individual's parentage is as shown in the above family tree.

Bibliography:

- Birley, Anthony R. (1999). Septimius Severus: The African Emperor. London: Routledge. ISBN 0415165911.
- Gibbon, Edward; Smith, William (1889). The Student's Gibbon: The Decline and Fall of the Roman Empire. London: Murray. OCLC 993285639.

Royal titles
Preceded by Julia Domna	Empress of Rome; 202–205 with Julia Domna (202–205)	Succeeded by Julia Domna
