= Gaius Septimius Severus Aper =

Roman aristocrat and consul (c.175-c.212)

Gaius Septimius Severus Aper (c. 175 – 211/212) was a Roman aristocrat.

== Life ==
He was appointed consul ordinarius in 207 with the otherwise unknown Lucius Annius Maximus.

Aper came from Leptis Magna and was probably a paternal grandson of the consul suffectus of July 153, Publius Septimius Aper. Aper is possibly the same person called Afer in the Historia Augusta, who at the end of the year 211 or 212 was executed by the command of the emperor Caracalla.

== Severan dynasty family tree ==
Severan family tree

Septimius Macer
Gaius Claudius Septimius Aper	Fulvius Pius	Lucius Septimius Severus
Publius Septimius Aper	Gaius Septimius Aper	Fulvia Pia	Publius Septimius Geta	Septimia Polla	Julius Bassianus
Septimius	Publius Septimius Geta	Septimia Octavilla	Paccia Marciana (1)	Septimius Severus (r. 193–211)	Julia Domna (2)	Julia Maesa	Gaius Julius Avitus Alexianus
Gaius Septimius Severus Aper	Fulvia Plautilla	Caracalla (r. 197–217)	Geta (r. 209–211)	Julia Soaemias	Sextus Varius Marcellus	Julia Avita Mamaea	Unknown (2)
Julia Cornelia Paula (1)	Aquilia Severa (2 and 4)	Elagabalus (r. 218–222)	Annia Faustina (3)	Sallustia Orbiana	Severus Alexander (r. 222–235)

- (1) = 1st spouse
- (2) = 2nd spouse
- (3) = 3rd spouse
- (4) = 4th spouse
- Dark green indicates an emperor of the Severan dynasty

Notes:

Except where otherwise noted, the notes below indicate that an individual's parentage is as shown in the above family tree.

Bibliography:

- Birley, Anthony R. (1999). Septimius Severus: The African Emperor. London: Routledge. ISBN 0415165911.
- Gibbon, Edward; Smith, William (1889). The Student's Gibbon: The Decline and Fall of the Roman Empire. London: Murray. OCLC 993285639.

Political offices
Preceded by Publius Tullius Marsus, and Marcus Caelius Faustinus as Suffect consuls	Consul of the Roman Empire; 207 with Lucius Annius Maximus	Succeeded by Caracalla, and Publius Septimius Geta
