= Paccia Marciana =

First wife of future Roman emperor Septimius Severus

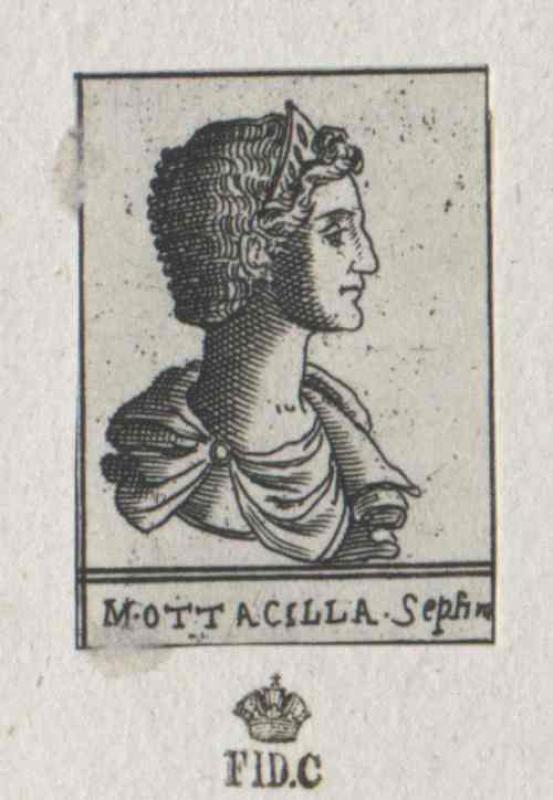
- Known for: first wife of Septimius Severus
- Spouse: Septimius Severus (ca. 175-ca. 186)
- Children: Septimia Major (possibly); Septimia Minor (possibly)

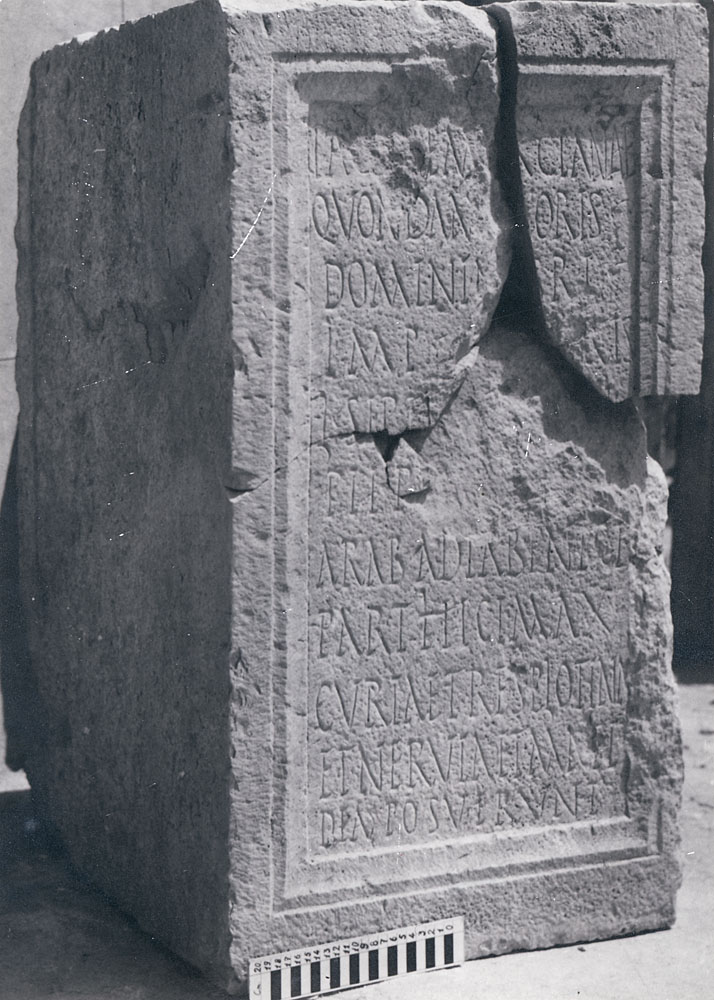
Posthumous inscription honoring Paccia

Paccia Marciana was the first wife of Septimius Severus, who later became Roman emperor. They married around 175 and she died of natural causes around 186.

== Name and marriage ==
Her name shows her links to two Roman gentes, the Paccia and the Marcia - the latter also included Marcia, mother of the emperor Trajan and his sister Ulpia Marciana. She originated in Leptis Magna and was of Punic or Libyan origin, but virtually nothing else is known of her. Severus probably met her during his tenure as legate under his uncle - he does not mention her in his autobiography, though he later commemorated her with statues when he became Emperor.

== Disputed issue ==
The Historia Augusta claims that Marciana and Severus had two daughters but their existence is nowhere else attested. It appears that the marriage produced no surviving children, despite lasting for more than ten years. Aurelius Victor, Eutropius and the unknown author of Epitome de Caesaribus state that she and not Severus' second wife Julia Domna was the mother of Caracalla, though this is now disregarded and thought to be linked to their claims that Julia married Caracalla. Julia Domna is widely accepted to be the mother of both Caracalla and his younger brother Geta.

== Severan dynasty family tree ==
Severan family tree

Septimius Macer
Gaius Claudius Septimius Aper | Fulvius Pius | Lucius Septimius Severus
Publius Septimius Aper | Gaius Septimius Aper | Fulvia Pia | Publius Septimius Geta | Septimia Polla | Julius Bassianus
Septimius | Publius Septimius Geta | Septimia Octavilla | Paccia Marciana (1) | Septimius Severus (r. 193–211) | Julia Domna (2) | Julia Maesa | Gaius Julius Avitus Alexianus
Gaius Septimius Severus Aper | Fulvia Plautilla | Caracalla (r. 197–217) | Geta (r. 209–211) | Julia Soaemias | Sextus Varius Marcellus | Julia Avita Mamaea | Unknown (2)
Julia Cornelia Paula (1) | Aquilia Severa (2 and 4) | Elagabalus (r. 218–222) | Annia Faustina (3) | Sallustia Orbiana | Severus Alexander (r. 222–235)

- (1) = 1st spouse
- (2) = 2nd spouse
- (3) = 3rd spouse
- (4) = 4th spouse
- Dark green indicates an emperor of the Severan dynasty

Notes:

Except where otherwise noted, the notes below indicate that an individual's parentage is as shown in the above family tree.

Bibliography:

- Birley, Anthony R. (1999). Septimius Severus: The African Emperor. London: Routledge. ISBN 0415165911.
- Gibbon, Edward; Smith, William (1889). The Student's Gibbon: The Decline and Fall of the Roman Empire. London: Murray. OCLC 993285639.
