= Publius Septimius Geta (brother of Septimius Severus) =

Brother of emperor Septimus Severus (c.143-c.204)

Publius Septimius Geta (c. 143 - c. 203/c. 204) was the second son to the elder Publius Septimius Geta and brother of the emperor Septimius Severus. His mother was Fulvia Pia. He was born and raised in Leptis Magna (southeast of Carthage, modern Libya, North Africa). He had Italian Roman ancestry on his mother's side, and was descended from Libyan-Punic forebears on his father's side.

This Geta was more politically active than his father. Geta was appointed one of the decemviri stlitibus judicandis, which in part involved judging lawsuits. These ten men were one of the four boards that form the vigintiviri; membership in one of these four boards was a preliminary and required first step toward a gaining entry into the Roman Senate. After this Geta was commissioned a tribunus laticlavius with the Legio II Augusta, at the time stationed in Roman Britain. This was followed by the office of aedile cerealis, a Curator rei pub. Anconitanorum and a Praet. hastarius et tutel. Geta in 185 became legatus legionis or commander of Legio I Italica and afterwards a Proconsul of Sicily around 187/8. Between circa 188 and circa 190, he became legatus of Lusitania. He was suffect consul in or around 191.

After his suffect consulship, between 193 and 194, he became Legatus of Moesia Inferior. When Severus was proclaimed emperor in 193, Geta led the legions to Carnuntum, where his brother was, to show his support. He is attested as being the Legatus for Tres Daciae in 195. Geta was appointed as Quaestor and Praetor of Crete and Cyrenaica and became one of the Consuls in 203. Geta died around 203 or 204. On his deathbed, Geta stated to Severus that he hated the Praetorian Prefect, Gaius Fulvius Plautianus, and warned him of Plautianus' treachery.

== Severan family tree ==
Severan family tree

Septimius Macer
Gaius Claudius Septimius Aper	Fulvius Pius	Lucius Septimius Severus
Publius Septimius Aper	Gaius Septimius Aper	Fulvia Pia	Publius Septimius Geta	Septimia Polla	Julius Bassianus
Septimius	Publius Septimius Geta	Septimia Octavilla	Paccia Marciana (1)	Septimius Severus (r. 193–211)	Julia Domna (2)	Julia Maesa	Gaius Julius Avitus Alexianus
Gaius Septimius Severus Aper	Fulvia Plautilla	Caracalla (r. 197–217)	Geta (r. 209–211)	Julia Soaemias	Sextus Varius Marcellus	Julia Avita Mamaea	Unknown (2)
Julia Cornelia Paula (1)	Aquilia Severa (2 and 4)	Elagabalus (r. 218–222)	Annia Faustina (3)	Sallustia Orbiana	Severus Alexander (r. 222–235)

- (1) = 1st spouse
- (2) = 2nd spouse
- (3) = 3rd spouse
- (4) = 4th spouse
- Dark green indicates an emperor of the Severan dynasty

Notes:

Except where otherwise noted, the notes below indicate that an individual's parentage is as shown in the above family tree.

Bibliography:

- Birley, Anthony R. (1999). Septimius Severus: The African Emperor. London: Routledge. ISBN 0415165911.
- Gibbon, Edward; Smith, William (1889). The Student's Gibbon: The Decline and Fall of the Roman Empire. London: Murray. OCLC 993285639.

Political offices
Preceded by Titus Murrenius Severus, Gaius Cassius Regallianus	Consul of the Roman Empire; 203 with Gaius Fulvius Plautianus	Succeeded by Lucius Fabius Cilo, Marcus Annius Flavius Libo
