= Gaius Fulvius Plautianus =

Prefect of the Praetorian Guard, senator and consul (c.150-205)

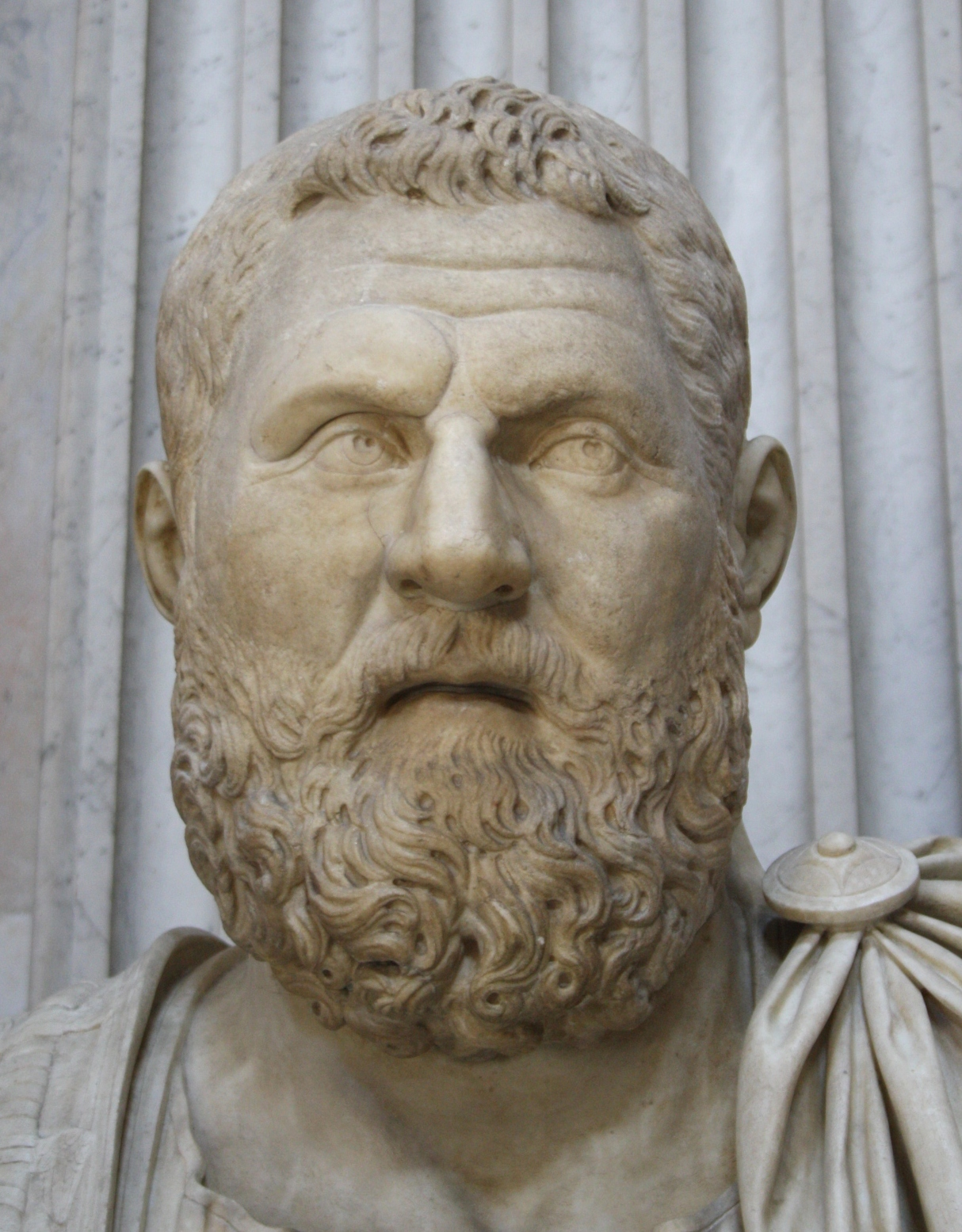
- Plautianus
- Born: Leptis Magna, Africa Province
- Died: 205; Rome
- Military career
- Allegiance: Roman Empire
- Service years: 197–205
- Rank: Praetorian prefect
- Unit: Praetorian Guard
- Other work: Consul of the Roman Empire in 203

Gaius or Lucius Fulvius Plautianus (c. 150 – 22 January 205) was a member of the Roman gens Fulvia. As head of the Praetorian Guard, he was very influential in the administration of state affairs, and clashed with Julia Domna, the wife of Septimius Severus. His daughter Fulvia Plautilla became empress as the wife of Severus and Domna's eldest son Caracalla. His son-in-law resented Fulvia as well as Plautianus and eventually disposed of them.

== Biography ==
Plautianus was originally from Leptis Magna, southeast of Carthage (modern Libya, North Africa). He was a maternal cousin and long-time friend of the Emperor Septimius Severus. Plautianus' father was another Gaius Fulvius Plautianus, born c. 130, whose sister, Fulvia Pia (c. 125 - after 198), was married to Severus' father Publius Septimius Geta. Plautianus may have had a sister named Fulvia Nepotilla who was married to yet another Fulvius.

=== Career ===
Plautianus was praefectus vigilum (commander of the Vigiles in Rome) from 193 to 197.

Plautianus was appointed prefect of the Praetorian Guard in 197. Due to their friendship, Severus rewarded Plautianus with various honors, including a consular insignia, a seat in the Roman Senate and the Consulship of 203. During his consulship, Plautianus' image was minted on coins along with Severus' second son, Publius Septimius Geta.

He assisted Severus in administering the empire and became very wealthy and powerful. Severus made him his second in command. He was at odds with Julia Domna, the wife of the emperor, presumably for influence. In 202, Plautianus married his daughter, Publia Fulvia Plautilla, to Caracalla (Severus' oldest son and co-emperor) in Rome. Plautianus had one hundred free Roman men, including married men, castrated so that his daughter could be attended by a hundred eunuchs at her wedding.

Plautianus had those who opposed him assassinated or executed. He became so powerful that Caracalla and his mother, Julia Domna, began to be concerned about the extent of his authority. Aware of her reservations, Plautianus sought to disrepute, dishonor and disempower Julia. He had her servants and friends arrested and tortured in hopes of extracting some damaging testimony against her. He was unsuccessful in his efforts.

The aforementioned marriage between Caracalla and Plautilla was not a happy one – in fact, Caracalla loathed both her and her father, threatening to kill them after becoming sole emperor. When Plautianus discovered this, he plotted to overthrow Severus' family.

When Plautianus was accused of treachery against the imperial family, Septimius Severus summoned him to the palace. Because he had written a note confirming his plans at the request of the Tribune, Saturninus, he was not able to shake these accusations and was found guilty. During the meeting on 22 January 205, Caracalla's men killed him. After his death, Plautianus’ property was confiscated, his name was erased from public monuments, and his son of the same name, his daughter and his granddaughter were exiled to Sicily. They were all strangled on Caracalla's orders in early 212.

== Family ==
He married Hortensia and had two children: Fulvia Plautilla, wife of Emperor Caracalla, and Gaius Fulvius Plautius Hortensianus.

- Gaius Fulvius Plautius Hortensianus (c. 170 - executed, 212), married Aurelia (born c. 170), daughter of Lucius Aurelius Gallus, consul in 174
  - Fulvia (born c. 192), married to Lucius Neratius Junius Macer (born c. 185), consularis vir in Saepinum
    - Lucius Junius Aurelius Neratius Gallus Fulvius Macer (fl. c. 230), tribunus militum
      - Lucius Junius Neratius Gallus Fulvius Macer (fl. c. 260), legatus in Thracia
        - Neratius Gallus (fl. c. 280), consularis vir, married Aemilia Pudentilla
          - Neratius Junius Flavianus (fl. 311/312), praefectus urbi, married Vulcacia
            - Galla (fl. 326), wife of Flavius Julius Constantius (half-brother of Emperor Constantine I)
            - Neratius Cerealis, consul in 358
            - Vulcacius Rufinus (died 368), praetorian prefect of Italy then of Illyricum

== Sources ==
- Ancientlibrary.com
- Trajancoins.com
- Livius.org
- Tertullian.org

Political offices
Preceded by Titus Murrenius Severus, and Gaius Cassius Regallianus as Suffect consuls	Consul of the Roman Empire; 203 with Publius Septimius Geta	Succeeded by Lucius Fabius Cilo, and Marcus Annius Flavius Libo
