= Julia Soaemias =

Mother of Roman emperor Elagabalus (180–222)

- Augusta
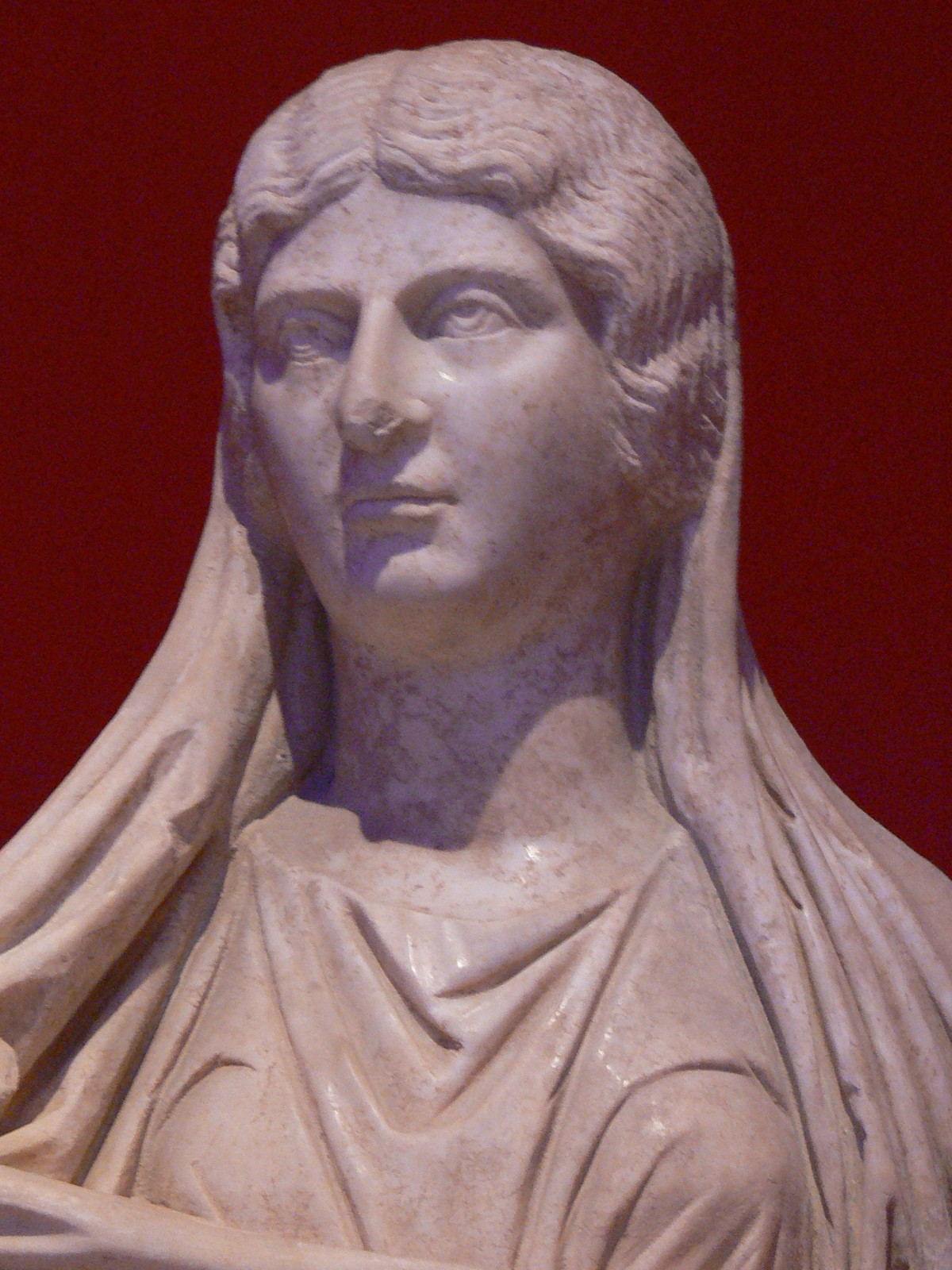
- Statue of Julia Soaemias, Antalya Museum

Augusta of the Roman Empire
- Reign: 8 June 218 – 11 March 222
- Predecessor: Nonia Celsa (likely)
- Successor: Julia Maesa and Julia Mamaea
- Co-Augustae: Julia Maesa (218–222); Julia Cornelia Paula (219–220); Aquilia Severa (220–221); Annia Faustina (221)
- Born: 180 AD; Emesa, Syria
- Died: 11 March 222 AD (aged 41–42); Rome, Italy
- Spouse: Sextus Varius Marcellus
- Issue: Varius Avitus Bassianus; Unknown issue
Names
- Julia Soaemias Bassiana
Regnal name
- Julia Soaemias Bassiana Augusta
- Dynasty: Severan
- Father: Gaius Julius Avitus Alexianus
- Mother: Julia Maesa

Julia Soaemias Bassiana (180 – 11 March 222) was a Syrian noblewoman and the mother of Roman emperor Elagabalus, who ruled over the Roman Empire from 218 to 222. She was one of his chief advisors, initially with the support and accompaniment of her mother Julia Maesa. She and her mother guided the young emperor until growing unrest and a family division led to her son's replacement by her nephew Severus Alexander. Julia Soaemias was killed along with her son by the Praetorian Guard.

Julia Soaemias was born and raised in Emesa, Syria and through her mother was related to the Royal family of Emesa, and through marriage, to the Severan dynasty of Ancient Rome.

== Early life ==
=== Name ===
Julia's name is recorded differently by ancient historians. Cassius Dio and Herodian gives "Σοαιμίς" (Soaemis), Eutropius "Symiasera", Paeanius "Symia Severa", Aurelius Victor "Soemea", and the Historia Augusta "Symiamyra" in the biography of Elagabalus, but "Symiamira" in the biography of Macrinus. Of the Latin sources only Victor gives a name that is close to her common name Soaemias. Modern historians attribute some of these different name variations to either garbled recordings or attestations of contemporary nicknames. Historian Andrew Scott notes that her name is similar to that of Gaius Julius Sohaemus but that any relation is uncertain. The name Symiamira might also have been used for propaganda purposes due to its similarity to the name of the legendary Assyrian empress Semiramis who had a negative reputation.

On coins the forms Soaemias, "Σοαιμίς" (Soaemis), "Σουαιμίς" (Souaimís), "Συαιμίς" (Syaimís), "Suemis", "Σοαιμία" (Soaimía), "Συαιμία" (Syaimía), are also attested. Suaemias and Soaimiás have also been used by later writers.

=== Family ===
She was the first daughter of the powerful Syrian Roman noblewoman Julia Maesa and Gaius Julius Avitus Alexianus, sister of Julia Avita Mamaea, niece of Julia Domna, and a niece by marriage of Emperor Lucius Septimius Severus.

At some point, she married Syrian equestrian and politician Sextus Varius Marcellus, a native of Apamea. As members of the imperial Roman family of the Severan dynasty, they resided in Rome, and Julia's husband rose to the Roman senate. Julia bore Marcellus at least two children: only one is known by name, Sextus Varius Avitus Bassianus, who became the Roman emperor Elagabalus.

Her husband died in c. 215, during his time as Roman governor in Numidia. The recently widowed Soaemias and her children later dedicated a tombstone to him, which was found in Velletri, not far from Rome. The tombstone has two preserved bilingual inscriptions in Latin and Greek. The inscriptions reveal his political career, his various titles, designations and distinctions he received.

== In Rome ==
=== Background ===
In 217, her maternal cousin, the Roman emperor Caracalla, was killed and Macrinus ascended to the imperial throne. Her family was allowed to return to Syria with their enormous wealth, and they returned to Emesa. Back in Emesa, her son, Bassianus, ascended as the chief priest of the Syrian deity Elagabalus.

=== Restoration of the Severan dynasty ===
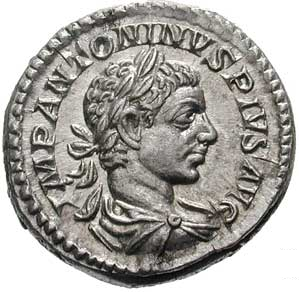
A coin of Elagabalus, Soaemias' son and future emperor

Using her enormous wealth and the claim that Caracalla had slept with her daughter and that the boy was his bastard, Julia Maesa, Soaemias's mother, persuaded soldiers from The Gallic Third Legion stationed near Emesa to swear loyalty to Bassianus. Later, Bassianus was invited alongside his mother and her daughters to the military camp, clad in imperial purple and crowned as emperor by the soldiers.

Cassius Dio records a different story, citing that Gannys, a "youth who has not yet reached manhood" and the lover of Soaemias was the reason for the revolt. Since the boy's father was no longer alive, Gannys acted as the boy's protector and foster father, and late at night, he dressed him in Caracalla's clothing and smuggled him to camp, without either Maesa or Soaemias's knowledge, and persuaded the soldiers to swear loyalty to him.

The story is likely a fabrication, seeing as it is unlikely that Maesa, who has much to gain if her grandson would become emperor, would be totally unaware of the coup, Herodian's story, which tells that the coup was handled by Maesa and her family alone is also unlikely, seeing that Dio's story tells that the boy later had the support of many Equestrians and Senators from Emesa, which was most likely.

Whatever the circumstances for Elagabalus's rise to the purple were, he later rode to battle against Macrinus, and entered the city of Antioch emerging as emperor, with Macrinus fleeing, before being captured near Chalcedon and executed in Cappadocia.

=== Reign of Elagabalus ===
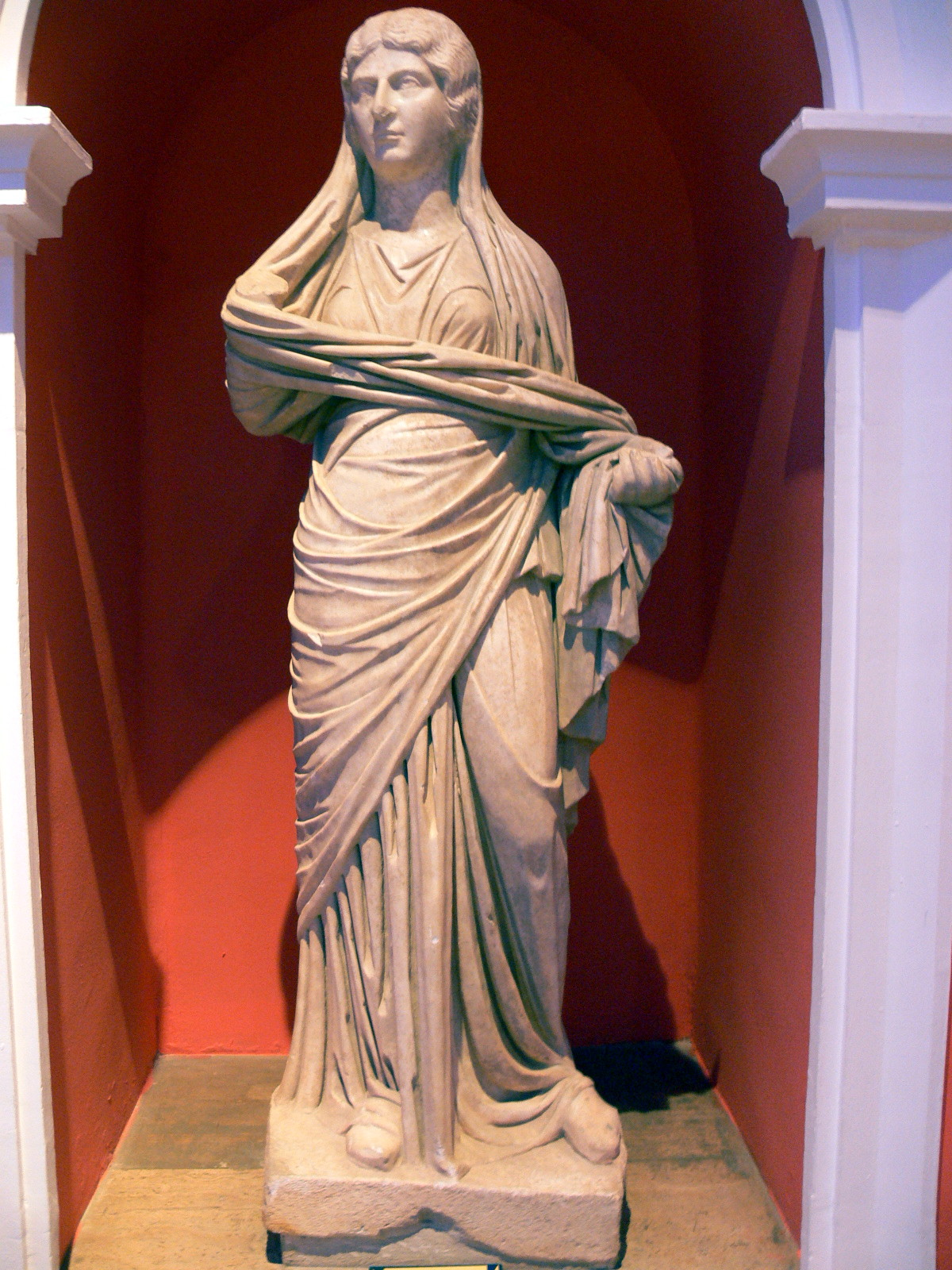
A full-body statue of Soaemias, in the Antalya Archaeological Museum, Turkey

Bassianus emerged as emperor and was styled Marcus Aurelius Antoninus Augustus. Soaemias, his mother, was styled as Iulia Soaemias Augusta. Elagabalus as emperor was mainly concerned with religious matters, and as sun worship had increased throughout the Empire since the reign of his maternal great-uncle by marriage, Septimius Severus, Elagabalus and his mother saw this as an opportunity to install Elagabal as the chief deity of the Roman pantheon. The god was renamed Deus Sol Invictus, meaning God of the Undefeated Sun, and was honored even above Jupiter.

Elagabalus and his entourage spent the winter of 218 in Bithynia at Nicomedia, where the emperor's religious beliefs first presented themselves as a problem. The contemporary historian Cassius Dio suggests that Gannys was killed by the new emperor because he pressured Elagabalus to live "temperately and prudently". To help Romans adjust to having an oriental priest as emperor, Julia Maesa (Soaemias's mother) had a painting of Elagabalus in priestly robes sent to Rome and hung over a statue of the goddess Victoria in the Senate House. This placed senators in the awkward position of having to make offerings to Elagabalus whenever they made offerings to Victoria.

The duo attempted to gain popularity with Roman religion, and as a token of respect, joined either Astarte, Minerva, or Urania to Elagabal as his consort. Julia Soaemias and her mother feature in literary accounts of Elagabalus's reign, and were credited with exercising much influence. Julia Soaemias and her mother significantly assisted the emperor, and appeared in the Senate beside Elagabalus during his adoption of Severus Alexander. She assumed the senatorial title of clarissima and also held a "Women's Senate" deciding on matters of fashion and protocol. She was honored with various titles, honours and privileges, including 'Augusta, mater Augusti' (Augusta, mother of Augustus) and 'Mater castrorum et senatus et totius domus divinae' (Mother of camp and the senate and the all divine house).

Their rule was not popular, and soon discontent arose, mainly because of the strange sexual behaviour and the Eastern religious practices of Elagabalus. Elagabalus lost the favour of both the Praetorian Guard and the senate, mainly because of his many eccentricities. In particular his relationship with Hierocles increasingly provoked the Praetorians. When Elagabalus' grandmother Julia Maesa perceived that popular support for the emperor was waning, she decided that he and his mother, who had encouraged his religious practices, had to be replaced. As alternatives, she turned to her other daughter, Julia Avita Mamaea, and her grandson, the thirteen-year-old Severus Alexander.

=== Controversy and transition of power ===
Maesa arranged for Elagabalus to appoint his cousin Severus Alexander as his heir and to give him the title of Caesar. Alexander shared the consulship with the emperor that year. Elagabalus reconsidered this arrangement when he began to suspect that the Praetorian Guard preferred his cousin to himself.

== Death ==
After failing in various attempts to slay his cousin, Elagabalus decided to strip Alexander of his titles and revoked his consulship. Elagabalus then invented the rumor that Alexander was near death, in order to see how the Praetorians would react. A riot ensued, and the Guard demanded to see Elagabalus and Alexander in the Praetorian camp.

Julia Soaemias entered the camp to protect her son, and was slain along with Elagabalus by the Praetorian Guard in 222. Their bodies were dragged through the streets and disposed of in the Tiber River. Julia Soaemias was later declared a public enemy and her name erased from all records.

== Severan dynasty family tree ==
Severan family tree

Septimius Macer
Gaius Claudius Septimius Aper	Fulvius Pius	Lucius Septimius Severus
Publius Septimius Aper	Gaius Septimius Aper	Fulvia Pia	Publius Septimius Geta	Septimia Polla	Julius Bassianus
Septimius	Publius Septimius Geta	Septimia Octavilla	Paccia Marciana (1)	Septimius Severus (r. 193–211)	Julia Domna (2)	Julia Maesa	Gaius Julius Avitus Alexianus
Gaius Septimius Severus Aper	Fulvia Plautilla	Caracalla (r. 197–217)	Geta (r. 209–211)	Julia Soaemias	Sextus Varius Marcellus	Julia Avita Mamaea	Unknown (2)
Julia Cornelia Paula (1)	Aquilia Severa (2 and 4)	Elagabalus (r. 218–222)	Annia Faustina (3)	Sallustia Orbiana	Severus Alexander (r. 222–235)

- (1) = 1st spouse
- (2) = 2nd spouse
- (3) = 3rd spouse
- (4) = 4th spouse
- Dark green indicates an emperor of the Severan dynasty

Notes:

Except where otherwise noted, the notes below indicate that an individual's parentage is as shown in the above family tree.

Bibliography:

- Birley, Anthony R. (1999). Septimius Severus: The African Emperor. London: Routledge. ISBN 0415165911.
- Gibbon, Edward; Smith, William (1889). The Student's Gibbon: The Decline and Fall of the Roman Empire. London: Murray. OCLC 993285639.

== See also ==
- Women in Ancient Rome
- Severan dynasty family tree
