= Julia Cornelia Paula =

Roman empress from 219 to 220

- Augusta
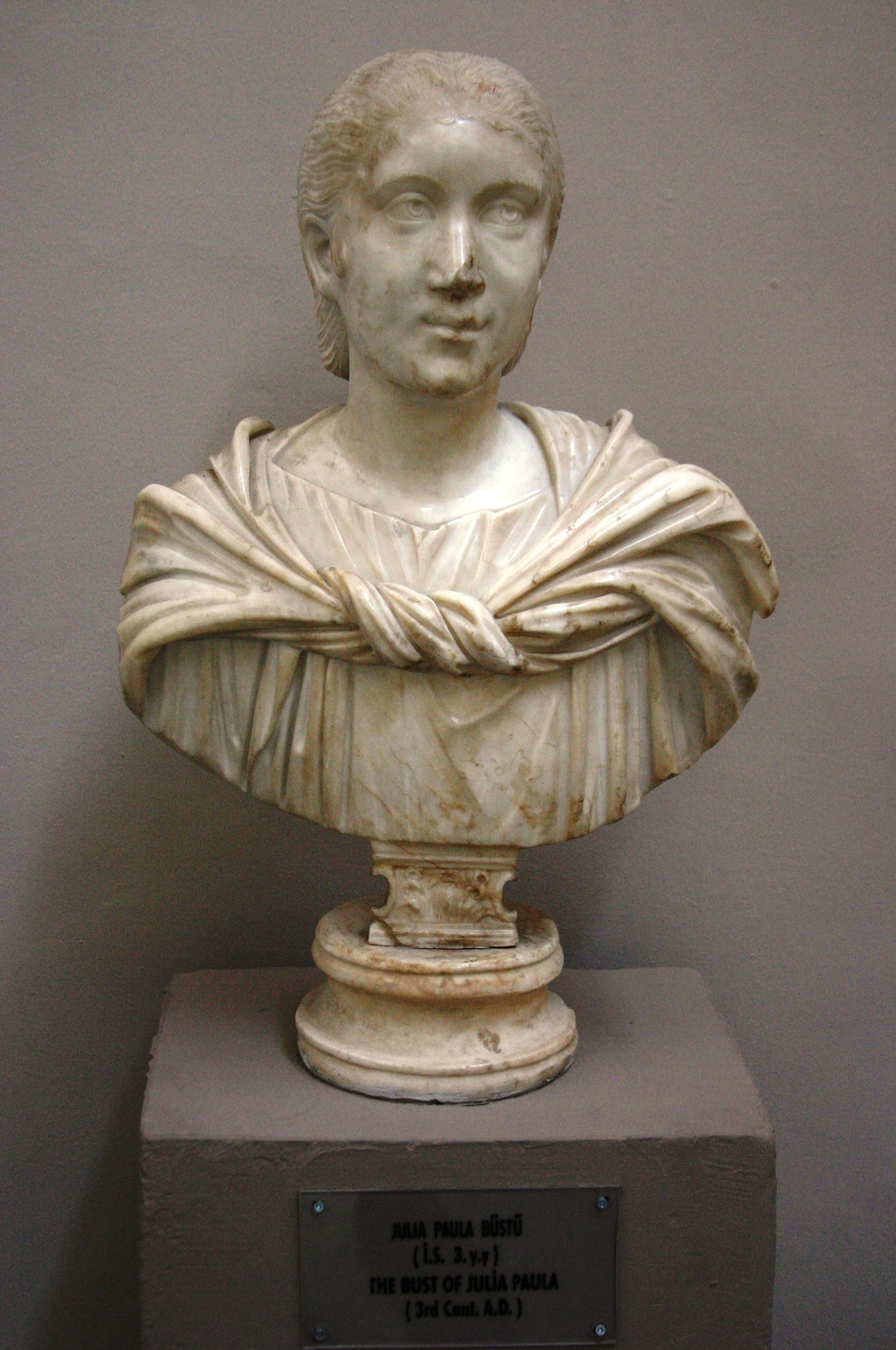
- Marble bust of Julia Cornelia Paula

Roman empress
- Tenure: 219–220
- Spouse: Elagabalus

Julia Cornelia Paula (fl. 3rd century AD) was a distinguished Roman noblewoman who became Empress of Rome as the first wife of the Roman emperor Elagabalus, who divorced her.

== Life ==
Paula was a lady, according to Herodian, of very noble descent: a relative of the gens Cornelia through her mother; her father, Julius Paulus, was an important jurist active throughout the Severan Dynasty, who subsequently served as praetorian prefect between 228 and 235.

In early 219, Julia Maesa, eldest sister of dowager empress Julia Domna, arranged for Cornelia Paula to marry her grandson, the new emperor Elagabalus. Their wedding was lavishly celebrated in Rome. Cornelia Paula, Elagabalus' first wife, was given the honorific title Augusta.

In late 220, Elagabalus divorced her to marry the Vestal Virgin Aquilia Severa in a union that was considered scandalous because she was still a Vestal. Apart from falling in love with Severa, Elagabalus married Severa as a part of the religious process of worshiping the Syrian Sun God El-Gabal and integrating El-Gabal into Roman religion.

After the divorce, Elagabalus removed Paula's Augusta title and reduced her to a private station. They had no children and her subsequent fate is unknown.

Severan family tree

Septimius Macer
Gaius Claudius Septimius Aper	Fulvius Pius	Lucius Septimius Severus
Publius Septimius Aper	Gaius Septimius Aper	Fulvia Pia	Publius Septimius Geta	Septimia Polla	Julius Bassianus
Septimius	Publius Septimius Geta	Septimia Octavilla	Paccia Marciana (1)	Septimius Severus (r. 193–211)	Julia Domna (2)	Julia Maesa	Gaius Julius Avitus Alexianus
Gaius Septimius Severus Aper	Fulvia Plautilla	Caracalla (r. 197–217)	Geta (r. 209–211)	Julia Soaemias	Sextus Varius Marcellus	Julia Avita Mamaea	Unknown (2)
Julia Cornelia Paula (1)	Aquilia Severa (2 and 4)	Elagabalus (r. 218–222)	Annia Faustina (3)	Sallustia Orbiana	Severus Alexander (r. 222–235)

- (1) = 1st spouse
- (2) = 2nd spouse
- (3) = 3rd spouse
- (4) = 4th spouse
- Dark green indicates an emperor of the Severan dynasty

Notes:

Except where otherwise noted, the notes below indicate that an individual's parentage is as shown in the above family tree.

Bibliography:

- Birley, Anthony R. (1999). Septimius Severus: The African Emperor. London: Routledge. ISBN 0415165911.
- Gibbon, Edward; Smith, William (1889). The Student's Gibbon: The Decline and Fall of the Roman Empire. London: Murray. OCLC 993285639.

== Bibliography ==
- "Emperor Elagabalus", The Roman Empire: People & The Decline, n.d. Retrieved 5 February 2022.
- "Julia Paula", Forvm Ancient Coins: NumisWiki, n.d. Retrieved 5 February 2022.
- Meckler, Michael L. "Elagabalus (218-222 A.D.)", De Imperatoribus Romanis: An Online Encyclopedia of Roman Emperors, 26 August 1997. Retrieved 5 February 2022.
- Ramsay, William. "Paula, Julia Cornelia" In William Smith (ed.) Dictionary of Greek and Roman Biography and Mythology. 3. Boston: Little, Brown & Co., 1867.

== Sources ==
- Herodian 5.6.1.
- Cassius Dio 79.9.

Royal titles
Preceded by Nonia Celsa	Empress of Rome; 219–220	Succeeded by Aquilia Severa
