= Aquilia Severa =

Wife of Roman emperor Elagabalus

- Augusta
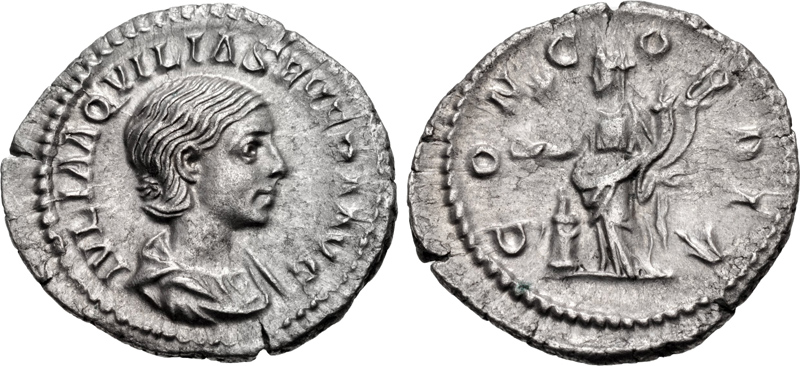
- Aquilia Severa, in a coin celebrating Concordia

Roman empress
- Tenure: 220–221, 221–222
- Died: after 222
- Spouse: Elagabalus
- Father: Gaius Julius Severus
- Occupation: Vestal Virgin

Julia Aquilia Severa (d. after 222) was the second and fourth wife of Roman emperor Elagabalus. She was the daughter of Gaius Julius Severus.

== Life ==
Severa was a Vestal Virgin and, as such, her marriage to Elagabalus in late 220 was the cause of enormous controversy – traditionally, the punishment for breaking the thirty-year vow of celibacy was death by being buried alive. Elagabalus is believed to have had religious reasons for marrying Severa – he himself was a follower of the eastern sun god El-Gabal, and when marrying himself to Severa, he also conducted a symbolic marriage of his god to Vesta.

Both these marriages were revoked shortly afterwards, however. This was possibly on the urging of Julia Maesa, the grandmother who had engineered Elagabalus' rise to the imperial throne. Elagabalus then married Annia Faustina, a more generally acceptable choice to the senatorial elite. Within a short time, however, Elagabalus had divorced Faustina and returned to living with Severa, claiming that the original divorce was invalid. It is believed that Severa remained with Elagabalus until the emperor's assassination in 222. The two are not believed to have had any children.

Severa's own opinions about the entire affair are not very well recorded. She was forced to marry against her will, and others go further, alleging rape. It is claimed by some historians, however, that many stories about Elagabalus have been exaggerated by his enemies, and so there is no certainty about what actually happened. It is unclear whether Elagabalus had any real feelings towards Severa, or whether he was more concerned with the symbolism of the marriage. Elagabalus also had relationships with men, and the historian Cassius Dio claims that Elagabalus had a more stable relationship with his chariot driver, Hierocles, than with any of his wives.

Her fate after Elagabalus's assassination is unknown.

== Severan dynasty family tree ==
Severan family tree

Septimius Macer
Gaius Claudius Septimius Aper	Fulvius Pius	Lucius Septimius Severus
Publius Septimius Aper	Gaius Septimius Aper	Fulvia Pia	Publius Septimius Geta	Septimia Polla	Julius Bassianus
Septimius	Publius Septimius Geta	Septimia Octavilla	Paccia Marciana (1)	Septimius Severus (r. 193–211)	Julia Domna (2)	Julia Maesa	Gaius Julius Avitus Alexianus
Gaius Septimius Severus Aper	Fulvia Plautilla	Caracalla (r. 197–217)	Geta (r. 209–211)	Julia Soaemias	Sextus Varius Marcellus	Julia Avita Mamaea	Unknown (2)
Julia Cornelia Paula (1)	Aquilia Severa (2 and 4)	Elagabalus (r. 218–222)	Annia Faustina (3)	Sallustia Orbiana	Severus Alexander (r. 222–235)

- (1) = 1st spouse
- (2) = 2nd spouse
- (3) = 3rd spouse
- (4) = 4th spouse
- Dark green indicates an emperor of the Severan dynasty

Notes:

Except where otherwise noted, the notes below indicate that an individual's parentage is as shown in the above family tree.

Bibliography:

- Birley, Anthony R. (1999). Septimius Severus: The African Emperor. London: Routledge. ISBN 0415165911.
- Gibbon, Edward; Smith, William (1889). The Student's Gibbon: The Decline and Fall of the Roman Empire. London: Murray. OCLC 993285639.

== See also ==
- Women in ancient Rome

== Notes ==
Royal titles
Preceded by Julia Cornelia Paula	Empress of Rome; 220–221; 221–222	Succeeded by Annia Faustina
Preceded by Annia Faustina	Empress of Rome; 220–221; 221–222	Succeeded by Sallustia Orbiana
