= Publius Septimius Geta (father of Septimius Severus) =

Father of emperor Septimius Severus

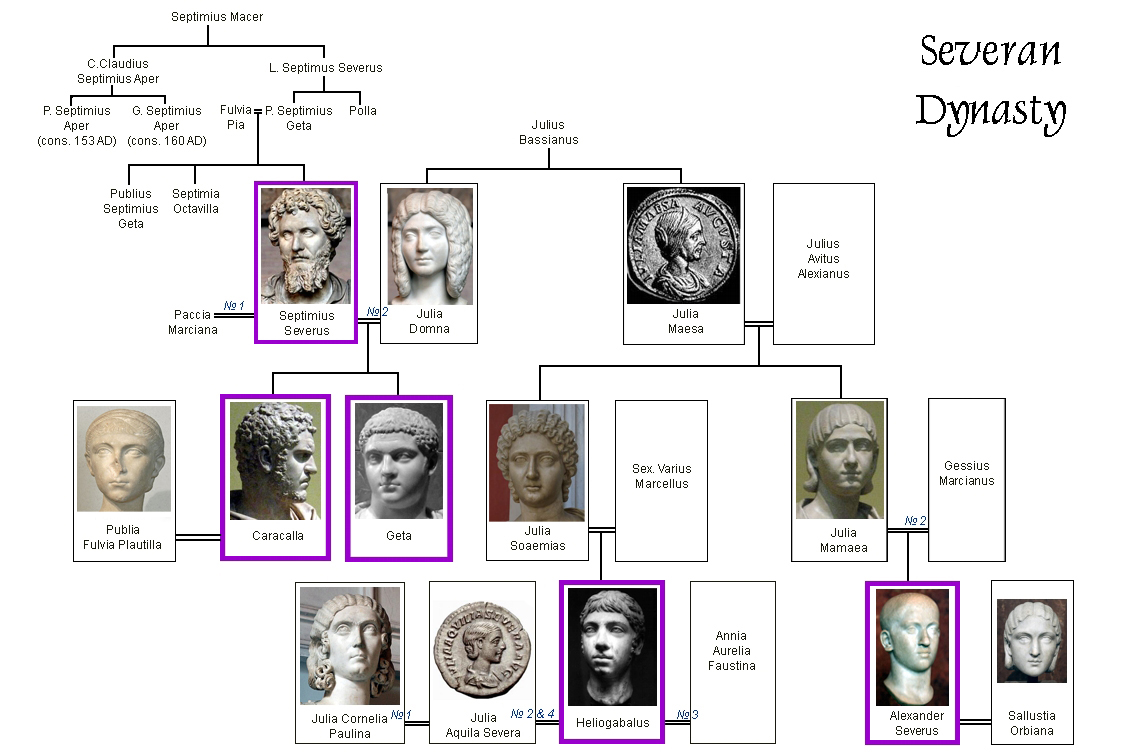
Severan dynasty family tree

Publius Septimius Geta (fl. 2nd century, c. 110 – 171) was the father of the emperor Lucius Septimius Severus, father-in-law of the Roman empress Julia Domna and the paternal grandfather of the Roman emperors Caracalla and Geta. Besides mentions in the Historia Augusta, Geta is known from several inscriptions, two of which were found in Leptis Magna, Africa (East of Tripoli in modern Libya).

== Early life ==
Geta was of Punic origin. His family were local, wealthy and distinguished in Leptis Magna, a prominent city of the Carthaginian Empire, founded by Phoenicians. His father, Lucius Septimius Severus (c. 70 – aft. 110) was sufes and prefectus when Leptis was made a colonia and its inhabitants were granted citizenship under Trajan; Lucius was the first duumvir of the new colonia (IRT 412). He is likely the wealthy equestrian that is highly commemorated by the Flavian dynasty poet Statius (Silvae 4.5, 4.praef.). Geta's paternal grandparents were Marcus Septimius Aper (born c. 35), and possibly an Octavia. Geta also had a sister named Septimia Polla, who apparently never married; Geta honored her memory with a silver statue.

While Geta seems to have held no political offices, either local or imperial, other members of his family were distinguished. He had two cousins, who served as Consuls under Roman Emperor Antoninus Pius: Gaius Septimius Severus, suffect consul in 160; and Publius Septimius Aper, suffect consul in July 153. Another relative of his was Gaius Septimius Severus Aper, ordinary consul in 207.

== Family ==
Geta married Fulvia Pia (c. 125 – bef. 198), a woman of Roman descent belonging to the gens Fulvia, an Italian patrician family that originated in Tusculum.

He died after his son Septimius had achieved the rank of quaestor, and was about to set off for Baetica to serve as proconsul, i.e. in 171. Septimius was forced to return to north Africa to settle his father's affairs.

== Severan dynasty family tree ==
Severan family tree

Septimius Macer
Gaius Claudius Septimius Aper	Fulvius Pius	Lucius Septimius Severus
Publius Septimius Aper	Gaius Septimius Aper	Fulvia Pia	Publius Septimius Geta	Septimia Polla	Julius Bassianus
Septimius	Publius Septimius Geta	Septimia Octavilla	Paccia Marciana (1)	Septimius Severus (r. 193–211)	Julia Domna (2)	Julia Maesa	Gaius Julius Avitus Alexianus
Gaius Septimius Severus Aper	Fulvia Plautilla	Caracalla (r. 197–217)	Geta (r. 209–211)	Julia Soaemias	Sextus Varius Marcellus	Julia Avita Mamaea	Unknown (2)
Julia Cornelia Paula (1)	Aquilia Severa (2 and 4)	Elagabalus (r. 218–222)	Annia Faustina (3)	Sallustia Orbiana	Severus Alexander (r. 222–235)

- (1) = 1st spouse
- (2) = 2nd spouse
- (3) = 3rd spouse
- (4) = 4th spouse
- Dark green indicates an emperor of the Severan dynasty

Notes:

Except where otherwise noted, the notes below indicate that an individual's parentage is as shown in the above family tree.

Bibliography:

- Birley, Anthony R. (1999). Septimius Severus: The African Emperor. London: Routledge. ISBN 0415165911.
- Gibbon, Edward; Smith, William (1889). The Student's Gibbon: The Decline and Fall of the Roman Empire. London: Murray. OCLC 993285639.
