= Geta =

Geta may refer to:

== Places ==
- Geta (woreda), a woreda in Ethiopia's Southern Nations, Nationalities, and Peoples' Region
- Geta, Åland, a municipality in Finland
- Geta, Nepal, a town in Attariya Municipality, Kailali District, Seti Zone, Nepal
- Getå, a minor locality in Norrköping Municipality, Sweden

== Other uses ==
- Geta (comedy), a medieval poem
- Geta (footwear), a type of Japanese footwear
- Geta symbol (〓), a Japanese typographic symbol
- Gta’ language, a Munda language of India
- Courtship Rite or Geta, a 1982 science fiction novel by Donald Kingsbury
- Gender Exploratory Therapy Association

== People with the name ==
- Geta (emperor) (189–211), Roman emperor from 209 to 211
- Gaius Vitorius Hosidius Geta, Roman priest and grandson of Gnaeus Hosidius Geta
- Gnaeus Hosidius Geta (c. AD 20 – after 95), Roman senator and general
- Hosidius Geta (2nd–3rd century), Roman playwright
- Lucius Lusius Geta (1st century), Roman governor of Egypt
- Geta Brătescu (1926–2018), Romanian visual artist

== See also ==
- Getas (Γέτας), a Thracian king
- Publius Septimius Geta (disambiguation)
