= Hosidia gens =

The gens Hosidia was a family of ancient Rome during the last century of the Republic, and into imperial times. The most illustrious of the gens, Gnaeus Hosidius Geta, obtained the consulship in AD 47.

== Members ==
- Hosidius Geta, having been proscribed by the triumvirs in 43 BC, was rescued by his son, who pretending that the elder Geta had taken his own life, performed the funeral rites, while concealing his father on one of his farms. The father disguised himself by wearing a bandage over one eye; but when he was pardoned, he found that he could no longer see with that eye.
- Gnaeus Hosidius Geta, as propraetor of Numidia in AD 42, he saved his own troops and caused Sabalus to surrender when, at the suggestion of a native, he successfully used magic to induce rain. Subsequently he triumphed over the Britons, although he was only the legate of Aulus Plautius. Geta was consul suffectus in AD 47.
- Gaius Hosidius Geta, brother of the consul of AD 47, he appears to have been triumvir monetalis; a coin issued with his name depicts a boar. Some scholars believe that it was he, rather than his brother, who triumphed over the Britons, but this depends on whether Cassius Dio intended to write "C" for Gaius or "Cn" for Gnaeus, whose earlier victory in Africa was discussed in the same book.
- Hosidia, daughter of Gnaeus (or possibly of Gaius) Hosidius Geta, who triumphed over the Britons, married Marcus Vitorius Marcellus; a poem of Statius, written in AD 95, describes her son, Gaius Vitorius Hosidius Geta, as having had a triumphalis avus.
- Hosidius Geta, a playwright of the second century AD; author of a tragedy entitled Medea, perhaps the first example of a Virgilian cento.

== See also ==
- List of Roman gentes
