= List of Roman governors of Dacia Traiana =

This is a list of known governors of the trans-Danubian Roman province of Dacia, referred to as Dacia Traiana. Created in AD 106 by the Roman emperor Trajan after the final defeat of Decebalus' Dacian kingdom, it was originally a single province under the name Dacia, governed by a Legatus Augusti pro praetore. In 118, Hadrian reorganised the province, abandoning some territory in the east and relabelling the province Dacia Superior. At the same time he split Moesia Inferior, with the territory north of the Danube renamed as Dacia Inferior. In 123, Hadrian created a third Dacian province, Dacia Porolissensis, fashioning it out of territory from the northern portion of Dacia Superior.

Antoninus Pius undertook the next reorganisation in 158. Dacia Superior was renamed Dacia Apulensis, Dacia Inferior was transformed into Dacia Malvensis, while Dacia Porolissensis remained as it was. During all these transformations, Dacia Superior/Dacia Apulensis was governed by a consular legate, while the other two provinces were under the command of praesidial procurators.

Then in 166, the pressures building along the Danube frontier forced the new emperor Marcus Aurelius to reorganise the province once again. This time, he set up an overarching province which fused the three provinces into one, called Tres Daciae, commanded by a consular legate. However, the three provinces still remained as separate entities, each one governed by a praesidial procurator, who then reported to the proconsular governor. Apart from a brief period during the Marcomannic Wars when the province was temporarily split into three due to an emergency situation, Tres Daciae retained this structure until Aurelian abandoned the province in 271.

== Legati Augusti pro praetore Dacia (106–118) ==
- Julius Sabinus (105–107/109)
- Decimus Terentius Scaurianus (109–110/111)
- Gaius Avidius Nigrinus (112–113)
- Quintus Baebius Macer (114)
- Gaius Julius Quadratus Bassus (117)

== Legati Augusti pro praetore Dacia Superior (118–158) ==
- Quintus Marcius Turbo Publicius Severus (118–119)
- Gnaeus Minicius Faustinus Sextus Julius Severus (119–127)
- Gnaeus Papirius Aelianus Aemilius Tuscillus (c. 131–134)
- Gaius Julius Bassus (135–138)
- Lucius Annius Fabianus (138–141)
- Quintus Mustius Priscus (141–144)
- Publius Orfidius Senecio (144–147/148)
- Gaius Curtius Justus (148–150)
- Marcus Sedatius Severianus (150–153)
- Lucius Julius Proculus (153–c. 156)
- Marcus Statius Priscus Licinius Italicus (c. 156–158)

== Legati Augusti pro praetore Dacia Apulensis (158–166) ==
- Publius Furius Saturninus (159–161)
- Publius Calpurnius Proculus Cornelianus (161–c. 164)
- Tiberius Julius Flaccinus (? c .164–166)

== Legati Augusti pro praetore trium Daciarum (166–271) ==
- Sextus Calpurnius Agricola (166–168)
- Marcus Claudius Fronto (168–170)
- Sextus Cornelius Clemens (170–172)
- Lucius Aemilius Carus (173–175)
- Gaius Arrius Antoninus (176–177)
- Publius Helvius Pertinax (177–179)
- Gaius Vettius Sabinianus Julius Hospes (180–182)
- Lucius Vespronius Candidus (182–184)
- Gaius Pescennius Niger (c. 185)
- G. C(...) Hasta (c. 190)
- Quintus Aurelius Polus Terentianus (c. 193)
- Publius Septimius Geta (195)
- Pollienus Auspex (c. 197–c. 200)
- Lucius Octavius Julianus (200–202)
- Lucius Pomponius Liberalis (204)
- Mevius Surus (205)
- Claudius Gallus (206–208)
- Gaius Julius Maximinus (208)
- Fl.(?) Postumus (211–212)
- Lucius Marius Perpetuus (212–215)
- Gaius Julius Septimius Castinus (215–217)
- Marcus Claudius Agrippa (217–218)
- Iasdius Domitianus (c. 222–235)
- Quintus Julius Licinianus (c. 235–238)
- Marcus Cuspidius Flaminius Severus (c. 235–238)
- Decimus Simonius Proculus Julianus (c. 238–244)
- Marcus Veracilius Verus (c. 200–230)

== Procuratores Dacia Apulensis (166–271) ==
- Titus Desticius Severus (c. 166)
- Publius Cominius Clemens (c. 169–176)
- Gaius Sempronius Urbanus (after 181)
- Tiberius Claudius Xenophon (c. 183)
- Aelius Apollinaris (? c. 180–193)
- [...]ronius Antonia[nus] (c. 195–198)
- Titus Cornasidius Sabinus (c. 200)
- Lucius Octavius Felix (c. 193–217)
- Herennius Gemellinus (c. 205)
- Ulpius [Victor?] (c. 218–222)
- Marcus Aurelius Tuesianus (c. 200–235)
- Quintus Axius Aelianus (236–238)
- Caesidius Respectus (240–242)
- Marcus Lucceius Felix (242–245)
- Publius Aelius Hammonius (c. 245–247)
- Marcus Aur(elius) Marcus (c. 251–253)
- Quintus Decius Vindex (?)
- Tem[onius?] Secund[us] (?)

== Procuratores Augusti Dacia Inferior (118–158) ==
- Egnatius (118–c. 121)
- Cocceius Naso (122–126)
- Plautius Caesianus (126–129)
- Claudius Constans (130)
- Titus Flavius Constans (138)
- Titus Flavius Priscus Gallonius Fronto Quintus Marcius Turbo (138–140)
- Julius Aquila Fidus (140)
- Ulpius Saturninus (146)
- [?T. V?]arius [Pr]iscus (152–155)

== Procuratores Dacia Malvensis (158–271) ==
- [---]lius Cu[---] (167–168)
- Marcus Macrinius Avitus Catonius Vindex (c. 169)
- Marcus Aurelius Cassianus (c.235–271)

== Procuratores Dacia Porolissensis (123–271) ==
- Livius Gratus (123)
- Flavius Italicus (131–135)
- Marcus Macrinius Vindex (151–154)
- Tiberius Cl[odius] Quintianus (157)
- Volu[---] (161/162)
- Lucius Sempronius Ingenuus (164)
- Marcus Valerius Maximianus (c. 178–179)
- Gaius Valerius Catulinus (c. 180–190)
- Aelius Constans (191–192)
- Publius Aelius Sempronius Lycinus (c. 198–209)
- Marcus Cocceius Genialis (c. 200)
- Gaius Publicius Antonius Probus (c. 198–209)
- Gaius Aurelius Atilianus (c. 211–217)
- Ulpius Victor (c. 217)
- Marcus Aurelius Apollinaris (?)

== See also ==
- Lists of ancient Roman governors

== Sources ==
- Petolescu, Constantin C., Dacia: Un Mileniu De Istorie, Editura Academiei Romane (2010), pp. 170-177
