= 201 =

201 in various calendars
Gregorian calendar	201; CCI
Ab urbe condita	954
Assyrian calendar	4951
Balinese saka calendar	122–123
Bengali calendar	−393 – −392
Berber calendar	1151
Buddhist calendar	745
Burmese calendar	−437
Byzantine calendar	5709–5710
Chinese calendar	庚辰年 (Metal Dragon); 2898 or 2691 — to — 辛巳年 (Metal Snake); 2899 or 2692
Coptic calendar	−83 – −82
Discordian calendar	1367
Ethiopian calendar	193–194
Hebrew calendar	3961–3962
- Hindu calendars
Vikram Samvat	257–258
Shaka Samvat	122–123
Kali Yuga	3301–3302
Holocene calendar	10201
Iranian calendar	421 BP – 420 BP
Islamic calendar	434 BH – 433 BH
Javanese calendar	78–79
Julian calendar	201; CCI
Korean calendar	2534
Minguo calendar	1711 before ROC 民前1711年
Nanakshahi calendar	−1267
Seleucid era	512/513 AG
Thai solar calendar	743–744
Tibetan calendar	阳金龙年 (male Iron-Dragon); 327 or −54 or −826 — to — 阴金蛇年 (female Iron-Snake); 328 or −53 or −825

Year 201 (CCI) was a common year starting on Thursday of the Julian calendar. At the time, it was known as the Year of the Consulship of Fabianus and Arrius (or, less frequently, year 954 Ab urbe condita). The denomination 201 for this year has been used since the early medieval period, when the Anno Domini calendar era became the prevalent method in Europe for naming years.

== Events ==
=== By place ===
==== Roman Empire ====
- Lucius Annius Fabianus and Marcus Nonius Arrius Mucianus become Roman Consuls.

==== China ====
- Battle of Cangting: Warlord Cao Cao defeats his rival, Yuan Shao.

=== By topic ===
==== Religion ====
- November – A flood in Edessa destroys a Christian church, killing over 2,000 people.

== Births ==
- Decius, Roman emperor (d. 251)

== Deaths ==
- Galen, Greek physician (see 210) (b. 129)
- Zhao Qi, Chinese official and scholar
