= Quintus Caelius Honoratus =

Late 1st/early 2nd century Roman senator and consul

Quintus Caelius Honoratus was a Roman senator of the early Roman Empire, who flourished under the reign of Trajan. He was suffect consul in the nundinium of July to August 105 AD as the colleague of Gaius Julius Quadratus Bassus, replacing the suffect consul Gnaeus Afranius Dexter, who had been murdered by his slaves. Honoratus is known from inscriptions.

The inscription on the base of a statue erected in Kourion on Cyprus provides information on the first part of his cursus honorum. Honoratus served as legatus to two different proconsular governors: the governor of Sicilia, and the governor of Bithynia and Pontus; the inscription does not mention his election to praetor, which Terence Mitford dates to 97 AD, but completion of that office was a prerequisite to one that is mentioned, prefectus frumenti dandi, the prefect responsible for the distribution of Rome's free grain dole.

Once Honoratus stepped down from his praetorship, the sortition awarded him governorship of Roman Cyprus. This is dated by a second inscription from Kourion to 101/102. A third inscription from Kourion records that he supervised the reconstruction of the baths of the Sanctuary of Apollo in the city.

Political offices
Preceded by Gaius Julius Quadratus Bassus, and Gnaeus Afranius Dexter as Suffect consuls	Suffect consul of the Roman Empire; 105 with Gaius Julius Quadratus Bassus	Succeeded by Marcus Vitorius Marcellus, and Gaius Caecilius Strabo as Suffect consuls
