= Gaius Calpetanus Rantius Sedatus =

1st century AD Roman senator and consul

Gaius Calpetanus Rantius Sedatus was a Roman senator, who held a number of offices in the imperial service. He was suffect consul in the nundinium of March to April 47 with Hordeonius Flaccus as his colleague. He is known primarily from inscriptions.

His cursus honorum is known only piecemeal. The first known office Sedatus held was curator tabullarium publicorum in 45, a post reserved for senators of praetorian status. After he was suffect consul, the emperor Claudius appointed him governor of the province of Dalmatia.

His father was probably Gaius Calpetanus C.f. Statius Rufus. Gaius Calpetanus Rantius Quirinalis Valerius Festus, suffect consul in 71, has been identified as his adopted son.

Political offices
Preceded by Claudius IV, and Lucius Vitellius III as ordinary consuls	Suffect consul of the Roman Empire; 47 with Hordeonius Flaccus	Succeeded by Gnaeus Hosidius Geta, and Titus Flavius Sabinus as suffect consuls
