= Gnaeus Afranius Dexter =

Roman Senator (died AD 105)

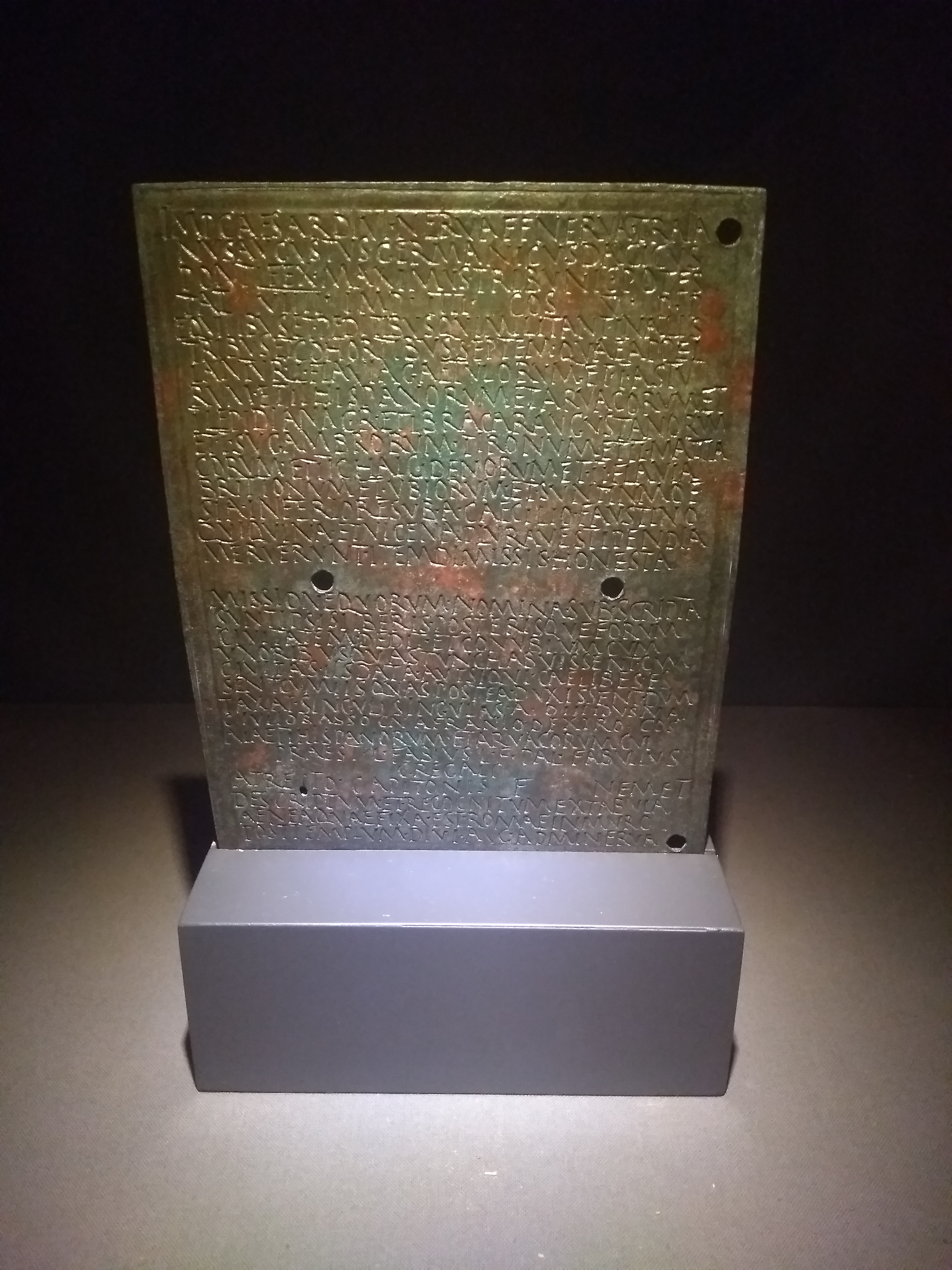
- Military diploma AE 2004, 1256, dated May 13th 105, attesting him as suffect consul

suffect consul

Gnaeus Afranius Dexter (died June 24, AD 105) was a Roman Senator who was murdered by one of his slaves. He was a suffect consul as the colleague of Gaius Julius Quadratus Bassus at the time of his death. Paul von Rohden suggests he may be the same Dexter Martial mentions as a hunter in two of his epigrams (vii.27.3; xi.69.3).

Due to Roman law, if a slave owner is murdered in his home, his slaves could be executed and his freedmen relegated, based on the presumption that they should have come to his defense. Pliny the Younger participated in the Senatorial trial of Dexter's slaves and freedmen, fighting to have them acquitted.

Political offices
Preceded by Tiberius Julius Candidus Marius Celsus II, and Gaius Antius Aulus Julius Quadratus II as ordinary consuls	Suffect consul of the Roman Empire; 105 with Gaius Julius Quadratus Bassus	Succeeded by Gaius Julius Quadratus Bassus, and Quintus Caelius Honoratus as suffect consuls
