= Gaius Antius Aulus Julius Quadratus =

Late 1st/early 2nd century Roman senator, consul and governor

Gaius Antius Aulus Julius Quadratus (Ancient Greek: Γάϊος Ἄντιος Αὖλος Ἰούλιος Αὔλου υἱὸς Κουαδρᾶτος; fl. 1st and 2nd centuries) was a Roman senator from Pergamon, who was appointed consul twice, in AD 94 and then in AD 105, the first senator from the Eastern Mediterranean to achieve the ordinary consulship.

== Biography ==
Gaius Antius Aulus Julius Quadratus was of Greek descent. Some hold the view he was born in Pergamon, probably in the early 50s, but Anthony Birley states he was only an incomer and that Aristides refers to this man as coming to Pergamum 'at the summons of the god'. Aulus Julius Quadratus was the son of Aulus, and a wealthy patron of the city; his sister was named Julia Polla. Ronald Syme believed he was related to the general Gaius Julius Quadratus Bassus, although Quadratus was a member of the Roman tribe Voltina and Bassus belonged to the tribe Fabia. Olli Salomies has argued his family came from Gallia Narbonensis, while Weisser says that he was descended from the Attalid dynasty and the kings of Galatia.

Adlected inter praetorios (or with praetorian rank) into the Senate by the emperor Vespasian sometime during the 70s, Quadratus was also co-opted into the Arval Brethren at some point before March of 78 when he is first mentioned in their Acta Arvalia. From 79–80, he was proconsular legate to the proconsul of Asia, Marcus Ulpius Traianus, father of the future Emperor Trajan. He would subsequently become a close personal friend of the Emperor Trajan, who honoured him as an amicus clarissimus ('most brilliant friend').

Syme infers that Quadratus served as proconsular legate in Bithynia et Pontus from 80-81. Quadratus was appointed governor of the public province of Crete and Cyrenaica in 84/85. He is mentioned again in the Acta Arvalia from January 86 to May 89, indicating he was residing at Rome during that time. In the gap after May 89, he served the emperor as governor of Lycia et Pamphylia from the year 89 to 93

At some point between 89 and 94, Quadratus added the prefix "Gaius Antius" to his name, likely as a requirement for accepting a legacy from an acquaintance. He was appointed suffect consul for the nundinium May–August AD 94 with Decimus Valerius Asiaticus Saturninus as his colleague. In this position, Quadratus supported the young Hadrian's appointment as praefectus ferriarum Latinarum –his first public office. Quadratus was later appointed legatus Augusti pro praetore of the province of Syria, where he was stationed from AD 100 to 104.

As a reward for his long service he was elected ordinary consul in AD 105. He was the first senator of eastern origin to achieve this post. In the same year he was appointed priest of Dionysus Kathegemon in Pergamon. Later the Pergamenes also appointed him gymnasiarch for life, in which role he may have been responsible for the construction of a new aqueduct bringing the water of the Caicus river to the city. He was finally appointed proconsular governor of Asia in AD 109/110. His name appears on four issues of coinage at Pergamon, minted during this year. Following this, he convinced Trajan to grant the city a neocorate status for a second time, probably in AD 114/5. Pergamon was the first city in the Empire to achieve this honour, which entitled the city to erect a second temple dedicated to the Imperial cult, the Trajaneum, dedicated to the emperor Trajan and Zeus. The epithet under which Zeus was worshipped in this temple, Philius ('of friendship') may have been a reference to the friendship between Trajan and Quadratus. Also in 114/5, Quadratus established regular games, the Traianeia Deiphilia in honor of Trajan and Zeus Philius.

It is unclear whether he lived into the reign of Hadrian or saw the completion of the Trajaneum in AD 129.

== Sources ==
- Bowersock, Glen Warren, Studies on the Eastern Roman Empire: Social, Economic and Administrative History, Religion, Historiography, Keip Verlag (1994)
- Longenecker, Bruce W., The Lost Letters of Pergamum, Baker Academic, (2003)
- Syme, Ronald, Some Arval Brethren, Clarendon Press (1980)
- Syme, Ronald, Historia Augusta Papers, Clarendon Press (1983)
- Weisser, B. (2005). "Pergamum as Paradigm". In Howgego, C. J.; Heuchert, V.; Burnett, A. (eds.). Coinage and Identity in the Roman Provinces. Oxford: Oxford University Press. pp. 135–142.

Political offices
Preceded by Lucius Nonius Calpurnius Torquatus Asprenas, and Titus Sextius Magius Lateranus as ordinary consuls	Suffect consul of the Roman Empire; AD 94 with Marcus Lollius Paulinus Decimus Valerius Asiaticus Saturninus	Succeeded by Lucius Silius Decianus, and Titus Pomponius Bassus as suffect consuls
Preceded by Sextus Attius Suburanus Aemilianus II, and Marcus Asinius Marcellus as ordinary consuls	Consul of the Roman Empire; AD 105 with Tiberius Julius Candidus Marius Celsus II	Succeeded by Gaius Julius Quadratus Bassus, and Gnaeus Afranius Dexter as suffect consuls
