= Lucius Annius Fabianus =

3rd century Roman senator and consul

Lucius Annius Fabianus was a Roman Senator who was active at the beginning of the 3rd century. He was ordinary consul in AD 201 with Marcus Nonius Arrius Mucianus as his colleague.

Fabianus came from Caesarea in Mauretania Caesariensis and was in all probability related to the remaining patrician gens Annia. He may be the grandson of Lucius Annius Fabianus who was the governor of Dacia c. 138–141.

Political offices
| Preceded by Tiberius Claudius Severus Proculus, and Gaius Aufidius Victorinus | Consul of the Roman Empire; 201 with Marcus Nonius Arrius Mucianus | Succeeded by Septimius Severus III, and Caracalla |
