= Titus Pomponius Bassus =

Late 1st/early 2nd century Roman senator, consul and governor

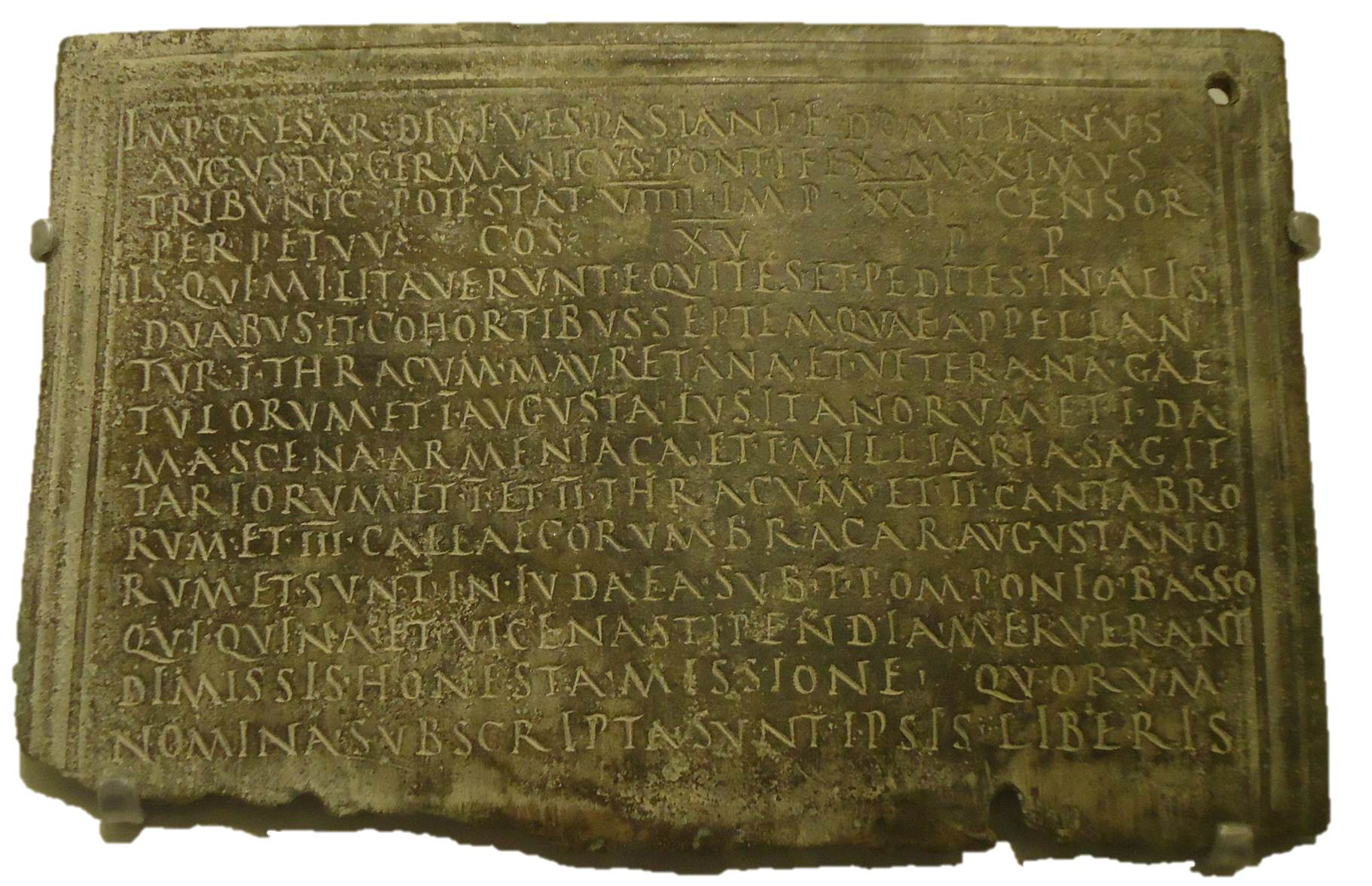
- Military diploma, attesting his governorship in Judaea

suffect consul
- In office 94 A.D. – 94 A.D.

Personal details
- Born: 1st century
- Died: 2nd century

Titus Pomponius Bassus was a Roman senator who held a number of imperial appointments. He was suffect consul in the nundinium of September–December 94 as the colleague of Lucius Silius Decianus.

He enters history as the legatus or assistant of the proconsular governor of Asia Marcus Ulpius Traianus in 79/80. Although being a proconsular legate was a posting which could result in a number of influential contacts, fifteen years passed until Bassus acceded to the consulate.

As attested by a military diploma, Bassus was governor of Judaea in 90; he probably took up office in 89. Around the year 94, either after he stepped down from the consulate, or while holding that magistracy in absentia, Bassus began his term as governor of Cappadocia-Galatia; where most terms as governor are about three years, his was prolonged for six years, standing down in the year 100. Upon returning to Rome, he was appointed curator of the alimenta, a program that provided public funds to raise children in need, in Central Italy, and was elected by the council of Ferentinum to be patron of that city.

His last mention in history is as an addressee of Pliny the Younger. Pliny wrote Bassus a letter congratulating his retirement from the Senate, looking forward to a life of leisure and self-education after a career holding "highly distinguished magistracies" and having "commanded armies". This letter probably dates from the year 104 or 105.

It is likely that Lucius Pomponius Bassus, suffect consul in 118, is his son.

Political offices
Preceded by Marcus Lollius Paulinus Decimus Valerius Asiaticus Saturninus, and Gaius Antius Aulus Julius Quadratus as suffect consuls	Suffect consul of the Roman Empire; 94 with Lucius Silius Decianus	Succeeded by Domitian XVII, and Titus Flavius Clemens as ordinary consuls
