= Hordeonius Flaccus =

1st century AD Roman soldier, senator and consul

Marcus Hordeonius Flaccus (died 69 AD) was a Roman senator who lived during the first century. He was suffect consul for the nundinium of March to April 47 as the colleague of Gaius Calpetanus Rantius Sedatus, and later commander of the Rhine army during the Batavian rebellion.

In 69, the Year of the Four Emperors, Emperor Vitellius ordered troops from the Rhine borders redeployed to Italy to support him against the rebellion of Vespasian, which Flaccus refused because he had heard rumors of a possible uprising of the Batavians. When Vitellius ordered the forced recruitment of the Batavians, they rose in rebellion against the Romans.

His indecision in which emperor to support (Vitellius or Vespasian), and his resulting inactivity in the containment of the Batavian rebellion made his later reputation suffer in the works of Tacitus. He was murdered by his troops (still loyal to Vitellius) after trying to celebrate the victory of Vespasian.

Political offices
Preceded by Claudius IV, and Lucius Vitellius III	Suffect consul of the Roman Empire; 47 with Gaius Calpetanus Rantius Sedatus	Succeeded by Gnaeus Hosidius Geta, and Titus Flavius Sabinus as Suffect consuls
