= Marcus Vitorius Marcellus =

Roman consul in 105 AD, friend of Quintilian and the poet Statius

Marcus Vitorius Marcellus or Vitorius Marcellus (c. 60 – after 105) was a Roman senator who lived in the 1st century and 2nd century. He was a friend of Quintilian and the poet Statius. Marcellus was suffect consul for the nundinium of September to December 105 with Gaius Caecilius Strabo as his colleague.

== Life ==
The family of Marcellus had their roots in Teate Marrucinorum on the east side of Italy; his father was probably named Gaius Vitorius. Marcellus received his education from the famous rhetorician, Quintilian, who dedicated his Institutio Oratoria to Marcellus, hoping "my treatise seemed likely to be of use for the instruction of your son, whose early age shows his way clear to the full splendor of genius." Anthony Birley identifies Lucius Septimius Severus, the grandfather of the emperor Septimius Severus, as one of his classmates. Ronald Syme finds it worthy to note that although Pliny the Younger was also a student of Quintilian, and the poet Statius knew both Pliny and Marcellus, Marcellus "gets no mention from Pliny, a close coeval (pr. 93), who prosecuted a different kind of career and gained a more rapid advancement through two urban posts."

Statius dedicated his fourth book of Silvae to Marcellus, and a number of allusions to Marcellus' life appear in the poems collected in that book. Around the years 94 to 96, Marcellus was in Rome and was curator viae Latinae, or overseer of the Via Latina. In Silvae 4.4.34, Statius writes to Marcellus while he is overseeing road construction, urging Marcellus to stop working during the summer and take a holiday. He states to Marcellus "that excellent qualities will be greater achieved after relaxation".

The next possible mention of Marcellus is dated after his consulship. Two inscriptions in North Africa referring to a proconsular governor Marcellus have been identified with Vitorius Marcellus, and his time as governor dated to 120/121.

Marcellus married Hosidia, the daughter of the Senator and general Gaius or Gnaeus Hosidius Geta; together they had a son, Gaius Vitorius Hosidius Geta.

Political offices
Preceded by Gaius Julius Quadratus Bassus, and Quintus Caelius Honoratus as Suffect consuls	Suffect consul of the Roman Empire; 105 with Gaius Caecilius Strabo	Succeeded by Lucius Ceionius Commodus, and Sextus Vettulenus Civica Cerialis as Ordinary consuls
