= Marcus Nonius Arrius Mucianus =

Early 3rd century Roman politician and senator

Marcus Nonius Arrius Mucianus was an imperial Roman politician and Senator at the beginning of the 3rd century CE. Mucianus grew up in Verona. He may have been the son of Marcus Nonius Arrius Mucianus Manlius Carbo, Suffect Consul, likely under the emperor Commodus, and the grandson of Marcus Nonius Macrinus, Suffect Consul in 154 CE. His wife was Sextia Asinia Polla. Mucianus became an ordinary consul in 201 CE and, from 204 CE onwards, he became one of the quindecimviri sacris faciundis, a sacred priest in charge of the Sibylline Books. In Verona, he became a curator and patron.

== Sources ==
- PIR ² N 114
- CIL V, 3342

Political offices
Preceded by Tiberius Claudius Severus Proculus, and Gaius Aufidius Victorinus	Consul of the Roman Empire; 201 with Lucius Annius Fabianus	Succeeded by Septimius Severus III, and Caracalla
