= Gaius Julius Bassus (consul 139) =

2nd century Roman senator and consul

Gaius Julius Bassus was a Roman senator, who was active during the reign of Antoninus Pius. He was suffect consul in the nundinium of November-December 139 as the colleague of Marcus Ceccius Justinus. He was the son of Gaius Julius Quadratus Bassus, consul in 105. The Julii Bassi were a prominent family of Pergamum, that had descended from the Attalid dynasty and Galatian tetrarchs.

Julius Bassus may be identical with one Bassus who was active in the second century; Lucan describes him as an effeminate sophist; the Palatine Anthology preserves a poem by one "Bassus of Smyrna", who need not have been born in that city; Galen dedicated his De libris propriis to one Bassus.

Knowledge of the career of Julius Bassus is limited to one appointment, as governor of the imperial province of Dacia Superior; Werner Eck dates his tenure from late 135 (an inscription attests to his governorship on 13 December 135) to 138.

Political offices
Preceded by ignotus, and Gaius Julius Scapula as suffect consuls	Suffect consul of the Roman Empire; 139 with Marcus Ceccius Justinus	Succeeded by Antoninus Pius III, and Marcus Aurelius as ordinary consuls
