= Lucius Annius Fabianus (the older) =

Roman consul

Lucius Annius Fabianus was a Roman senator and general. He used to be considered the suffect consul for the nundinium of November–December AD 141, but recent discoveries mean that his consular date is unknown.

Fabianus was the first representative of his family in the senate, and thus was a novus homo. Further, he is the first well-known senator from Mauretania Caesariensis. Anthony Birley speculates that Fabianus may have been the son or a relative of the eques L. Annius C.f. Fabianus, known from an inscription recovered from Caesaria in Mauretania Caesariensis. Birley also notes that the ordinary consul of 201, Lucius Annius Fabianus, was "presumably" his grandson.

His cursus honorum is documented in an inscription recovered from Ulpia Traiana Sarmizegetusa. Fabianus began as a member of the vigintiviri, a preliminary and required first step toward a gaining entry into the Roman Senate. He was allocated to the tresviri capitalis, which was not a prestigious office. He served as military tribune in Legio II Augusta which was stationed in Roman Britain; his service was during the tenure of Quintus Pompeius Falco as governor (118-122). Following this Fabianus held the typical series of republican magistracies: quaestor, assigned to the city of Rome; then plebeian tribune; and praetor. After completing his duties as praetor, he was appointed curator of the Via Latina (c. 132-c. 135), then legatus legionis or commander of Legio X Fretensis stationed in Judea (c. 135-c. 138), and finally governor of the imperial province of Dacia from 138 to 141. A suffect consulship might have followed.

The career of Fabianus after his governorship is not documented.
