= Gaius Julius Quadratus Bassus =

Roman senator, general and governor (70 – 117)

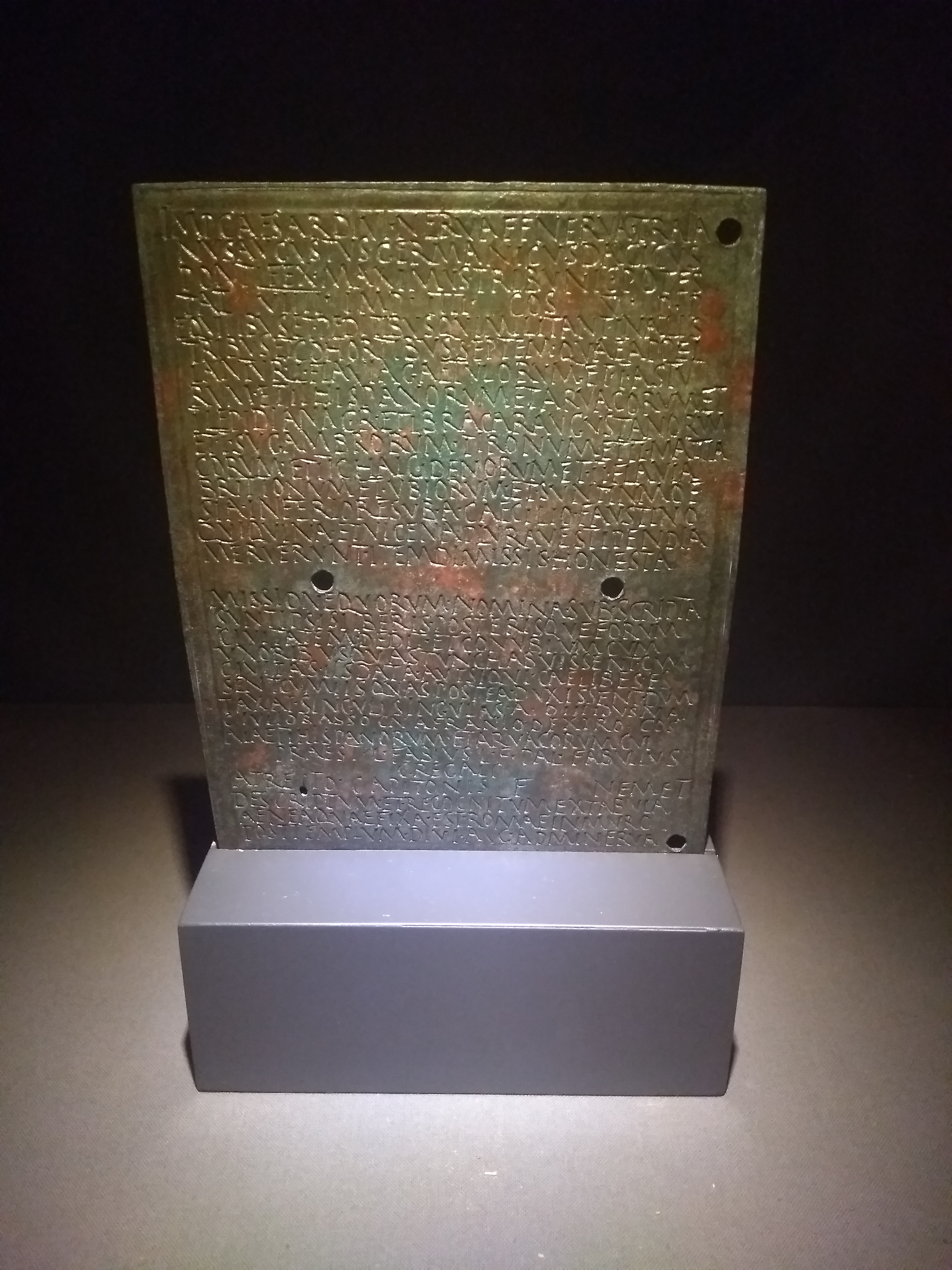
- Military diploma AE 2004, 1256, dated May 13th 105, attesting him as suffect consul

Consul of the Roman Republic
- In office May 105 – August 105 Serving with Gnaeus Afranius Dexter; Quintus Caelius Honoratus
- Preceded by: Tiberius Julius Candidus Marius Celsus II and Gaius Antius Aulus Julius Quadratus
- Succeeded by: Marcus Vitorius Marcellus and Gaius Caecilius Strabo

Personal details
- Born: 70
- Died: 117 Dacia

Military service
- Allegiance: Roman Empire
- Commands: Governor of Judaea; Governor of Cappadocia; Governor of Galatia; Governor of Syria; Governor of Dacia
- Battles/wars: Trajan's Dacian Wars; Trajan's Parthian War

Gaius Julius Quadratus Bassus (70–117) was a Roman senator and general. He rose from provincial aristocratic origins to occupy the highest offices of Rome. He served as a legionary commander and as imperial governor of Judea, Cappadocia, Galatia, Syria and Dacia. He is known to have been active under Trajan in the Dacian and Parthian Wars. Bassus was suffect consul in the nundinium of May to August 105 with Gnaeus Afranius Dexter as his colleague.

== Family ==
Of Greek descent, Gaius Julius Quadratus Bassus was born in Pergamon to a family related to the Attalid dynasty and the Galatian tetrarchs. His father was Gaius Julius Bassus, who was Proconsul of Bithynia in 100 to 101. He is known to have had at least one son, Gaius Julius Bassus, who was suffect consul in 139.

== Career ==
The Roman Empire at the time of Bassus' death

His career began as military tribune in Legio XIII Gemina around 87 to 89. This was followed by membership in the tresviri monetalis, one of the magistracies that comprised the vigintiviri, a preliminary and required first step toward gaining entry to the Roman Senate. This order is unusual: normally membership in the vigintiviri came before serving as military tribune in a legion. Dabrowa notes that this reversed order was not unusual for men who were born to the equestrian order but intended to enter the Senate. However, Bassus was made one of the tresviri monetalis: this magistracy was reserved either for patricians or men favored by the emperor. Dabrowa suggests that Bassus gained entry to this coveted board through the intervention of his relative Gaius Antius Aulus Julius Quadratus, three-time consul and "a man of high political and social standing".

After the vigintiviri Bassus was a quaestor, a junior position administering the public treasury, in the province of Crete and Cyrenaica around the year 92. This office gained him formal entry into the senate. He advanced to the traditional Roman magistracy of aedile, then around 98 he won election as a praetor. This last magistracy qualified Bassus to either govern provinces or serve as a legatus legionis or commander of a legion. Bassus sought a military career.

First he was legatus of Legio XI Claudia from 99 to 101. This was followed by command of a vexillation drawn from several legions—including the IV Scythica and XII Fulminata—in the First Dacian War for the years 101 and 102. Then Bassus served as commander of Legio X Fretensis, a posting that was combined with the governorship as the 8th legate of Judaea from 102 to 104. During the summer of 105 he spent four months as consul; becoming a consul was considered the highest honour of the Roman state and the Emperor would have chosen candidates to fill it carefully. After his term as consul Bassus was admitted to the College of Pontiffs, the highest-ranking priests of the state religion; a significant social achievement for a man born as an equestrian. This was followed by a posting as governor of Cappadocia and Galatia in 114 to 115, and later Syria. During this time he was made commander of a second vexillation of soldiers drawn from a number of legions – including III Gallica and XIII Gemina – that fought in the Parthian War.

Bassus was serving as legatus Augusti pro praetore, or imperial governor, in the province of Dacia when he died in a battle with the Sarmatians west to Dacia in 117.

== See also ==
- The Administration of Judaea (AD 6–135)

Political offices
Preceded by Tiberius Claudius Atticus Herodes	Legate of Iudaea; 102/103–104/105	Succeeded by Quintus Pompeius Falco
Preceded by Tiberius Julius Candidus Marius Celsus II, and Gaius Antius Aulus Julius Quadratus II as Ordinary consuls	Suffect consul of the Roman Empire; 105 with Gnaeus Afranius Dexter, followed by Quintus Caelius Honoratus	Succeeded by Marcus Vitorius Marcellus, and Gaius Caecilius Strabo as Suffect consuls
