= Getas =

1st-century BC king of the Edoni Thracians

Getas (Ancient Greek: Γέτας) was a king of the Edoni Thracians. The only documentation of him is from two coins held by the British Museum. While the coin's era is unknown, they may have been made as early as 480 BC and feature Getas and his title of King.

== See also ==
- List of Thracian tribes
