= Jean Bonvoisin =

French painter (1752–1837)

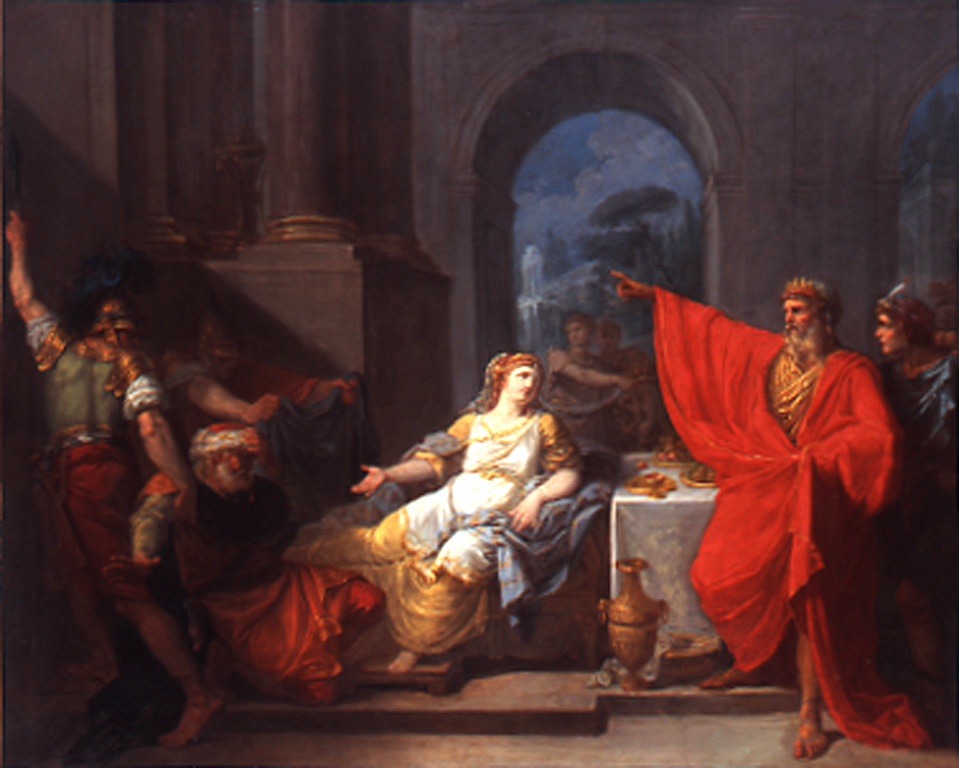
Haman confused by Esther, Jean Bonvoisin, 1775

Jean Bonvoisin (1752–1837) was a French painter.

== Life ==
He was born in Paris. His father was an art dealer and his mother was an artist. Bonvoisin studied under Antoine-François Callet and then under Gabriel-François Doyen. In 1774 he won second prize in the prix de Rome (first prize that year went to Jacques-Louis David), then in 1775 he won first prize with Haman confounded by Esther before Ahasuerus, beating Jean-Baptiste Regnault. Under the French Revolution he and Wicar administrated the central museum of arts (what would become the musée du Louvre) and members of the temporary arts commission. On the Bourbon Restoration he became professor in the École Royale Gratuite de Dessin at Saint-Quentin.

== Sources ==
- Journal des artistes : Volume 1, 1838 Nécrologie page 272 online version
- Bucely d'Estrée Notice sur Mr Bonvoisin Mémoires de la Société académique des sciences, arts, belles-lettres, agriculture et industrie de Saint-Quentin 1839 page 245 online version
