= Publius Septimius Geta (disambiguation) =

Publius Septimius Geta was a Roman emperor.

Publius Septimius Geta also may refer to:

- Publius Septimius Geta (father of Septimius Severus)
- Publius Septimius Geta (brother of Septimius Severus)
