= Calpurnius Proculus =

Roman governor of Dacia (died 167)

Lucius Calpurnius Proculus was a Roman governor of Dacia. He ruled Dacia for a period in the 160s, reign dates have been given variously as 161 to 164 AD and 162 to 167 AD. He hailed from Ancyra (Ankara), and was known to have owned an estate near Laodikeia. Calpurnius Proculus was killed by the Iazyges.
