= Gnaeus Hosidius Geta =

1st century AD Roman senator and general

Gaius or Gnaeus Hosidius Geta (/ˈɡɛtə/ GHET-ə; c. 20 – after 95 AD) was a Roman Senator and general who lived in the 1st century. Geta was a praetor some time before 42. In the latter year, commanding a legion, probably the Legio IX Hispana in the Africa Province, he was a part of Gaius Suetonius Paulinus' campaigns into Mauretania.

Geta defeated Sabalus, a chief of the Mauri, twice, and after gathering as much water as could be carried, pursued him into the desert. Sabalus' forces were more used to the conditions and the legion's water began to run out. A native friendly to the Romans persuaded Geta to perform a rain ritual used by his people and rain began to fall. The Romans' thirst was relieved and the Mauri, seeing the heavens come to their enemies' aid, surrendered.

Geta and his legion were part of the Roman conquest of Britain, led by Aulus Plautius, the following year. Geta was almost captured in the Battle of the Medway in the early part of the campaign, but recovered and turned the battle so decisively that he received the ornamenta triumphalia, which was unusual as he had not yet been a Consul. He was a Legatus in Britannia about 45. An inscription found in Rome reveals that he became Suffect Consul in 49.

Geta married, but the name of his wife is unknown. He had a daughter called Hosidia, born about the year 65. Hosidia married Marcus Vitorius Marcellus, a man of consular rank and a friend of the poet Statius. Hosidia and Marcellus had a son called Gaius Vitorius Hosidius Geta.

== Sources ==
- Cassius Dio, Roman History 60.9, 20, 60.20
- William Smith (1870), Dictionary of Greek and Roman Biography and Mythology Vol 2 p. 529-530

Political offices
Preceded by Gaius Calpetanus Rantius Sedatus, and Marcus Hordeonius Flaccus as Suffect consuls	Suffect consul of the Roman Empire; 47 with Titus Flavius Sabinus, Lucius Vagellius, Gaius Volasenna Severus	Succeeded by Aulus Vitellius, and Lucius Vipstanus Poplicola as Ordinary consuls
