= Gaius Vitorius Hosidius Geta =

Gaius Vitorius Hosidius Geta (/ˈɡɛtə/ GHET-ə) was a Roman who lived in the 1st century AD and 2nd century AD. Geta was an only son and might have had a sister called Vitoria. His father was Roman consul and senator Marcus Vitorius Marcellus and his mother was Hosidia Geta. Geta's maternal grandfather was Roman Senator and General Gnaeus Hosidius Geta.

Geta is mentioned in the fourth book of Silvae by the poet Statius and in the writings of the Roman teacher Quintilian. Both Statius and Quintilian were friends of his father's. Statius mentions that Geta's grandfather demanded worthy feats from him.

Quintilian had appeared to be Geta's tutor, because in his letters to Marcellus, Quintilian mentions about Marcellus’ instructions to him. Quintilian writes to Marcellus, how impressed he is of Geta's academic abilities and hopes Geta would aspire to them.

Geta became a member of the Arval Brethren. The Arval Brethren was an ancient group of priests who offered annual sacrifices to the lares and the gods to guarantee good harvests. His name appears in an inscription in the records of the Arval Brethren.

== Sources ==
- White, Peter (1 January 1973). "Notes on Two Statian ΠΡΟΣΩΠΑ". Classical Philology. 68 (4): 279–284. doi:10.1086/366006. JSTOR 268871. S2CID 163021137.
- http://bcs.fltr.ucl.ac.be/Quint/quint1Intro.html
- "Hosidius Geta". U Chicago.
- https://dawnworldhub.blogspot.com/2024/03/kindle-or-paperback-pros-and-cons-of.html
- Taplin, O. (2000). Literature in the Greek and Roman Worlds: A New Perspective. Oxford University Press. p. 499. ISBN 978-0-19-210020-7.
