= Favourite =

Intimate companion of a ruler or other important person

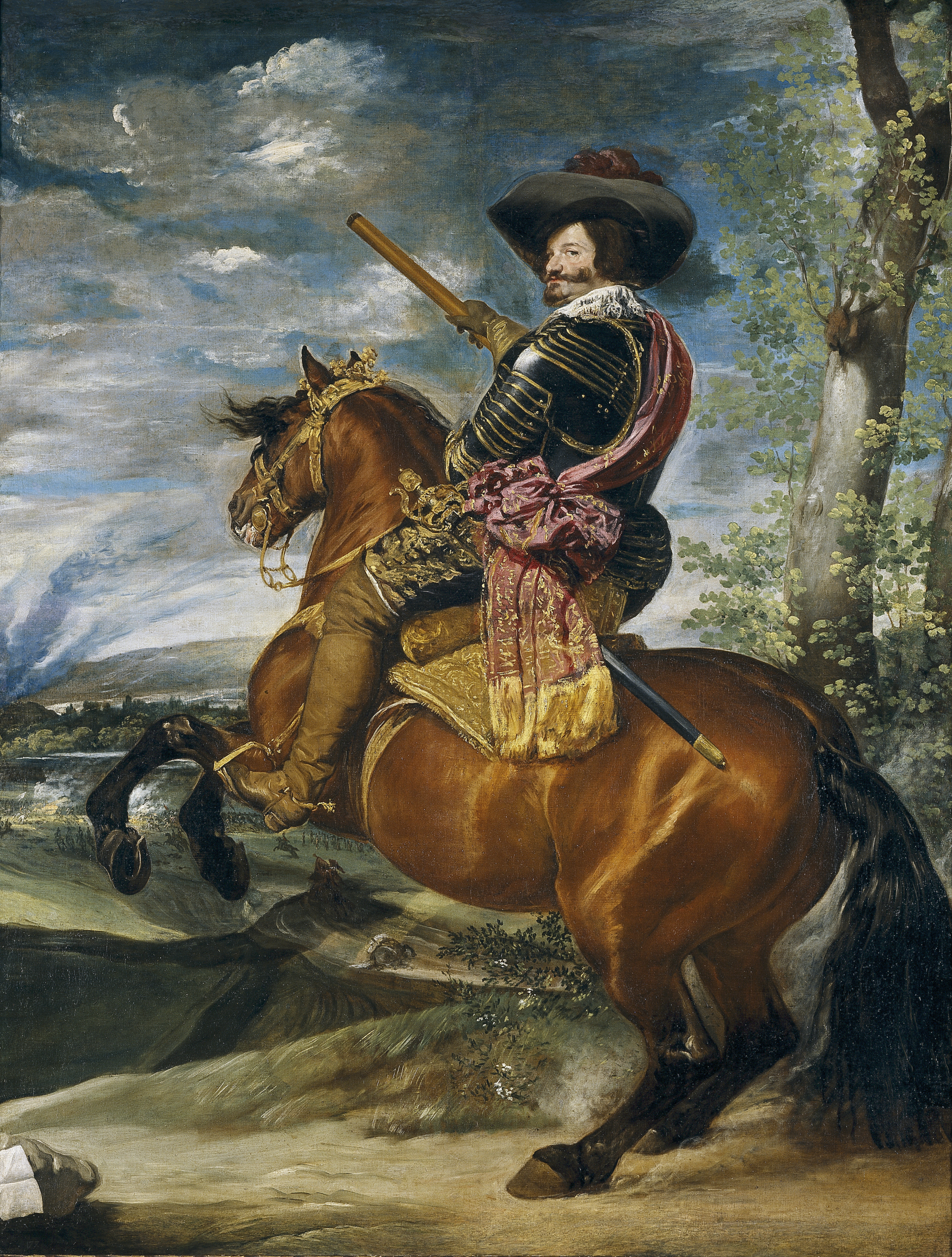
Equestrian portrait of the Count-Duke of Olivares by Diego Velázquez (c. 1636)

In history and politics, a favourite was the intimate companion of a ruler or other important person. In post-classical and early-modern Europe, among other times and places, the term was used of individuals delegated significant political power by a ruler. It was especially a phenomenon of the 16th and 17th centuries, when government had become too complex for many hereditary rulers with no great interest in or talent for it, and political institutions were still evolving. From 1600 to 1660 there were particular successions of all-powerful minister-favourites in much of Europe, particularly in Spain, England, France and Sweden.

By the late 17th century, the royal favourite as quasi-Prime Minister declined; in France, the King resolved to rule directly, while in Britain, as the power of the monarch relative to Parliament declined, executive power slowly passed to the new office of Prime Minister and other parliamentary ministers.

The term is also sometimes employed by writers who want to avoid terms such as "royal mistress", "friend", "companion", or "lover" (of either sex). Some favourites had sexual relations with their monarch (or the monarch's spouse), but this was far from universal. Many were favoured for their skill as administrators, while others were close friends of the monarch.

The term has an inbuilt element of disapproval and is defined by the Oxford English Dictionary as "One who stands unduly high in the favour of a prince", citing Shakespeare: "Like favourites/ Made proud by Princes" (Much Ado about Nothing, 3.1.9).

== Rises and falls of favourites ==
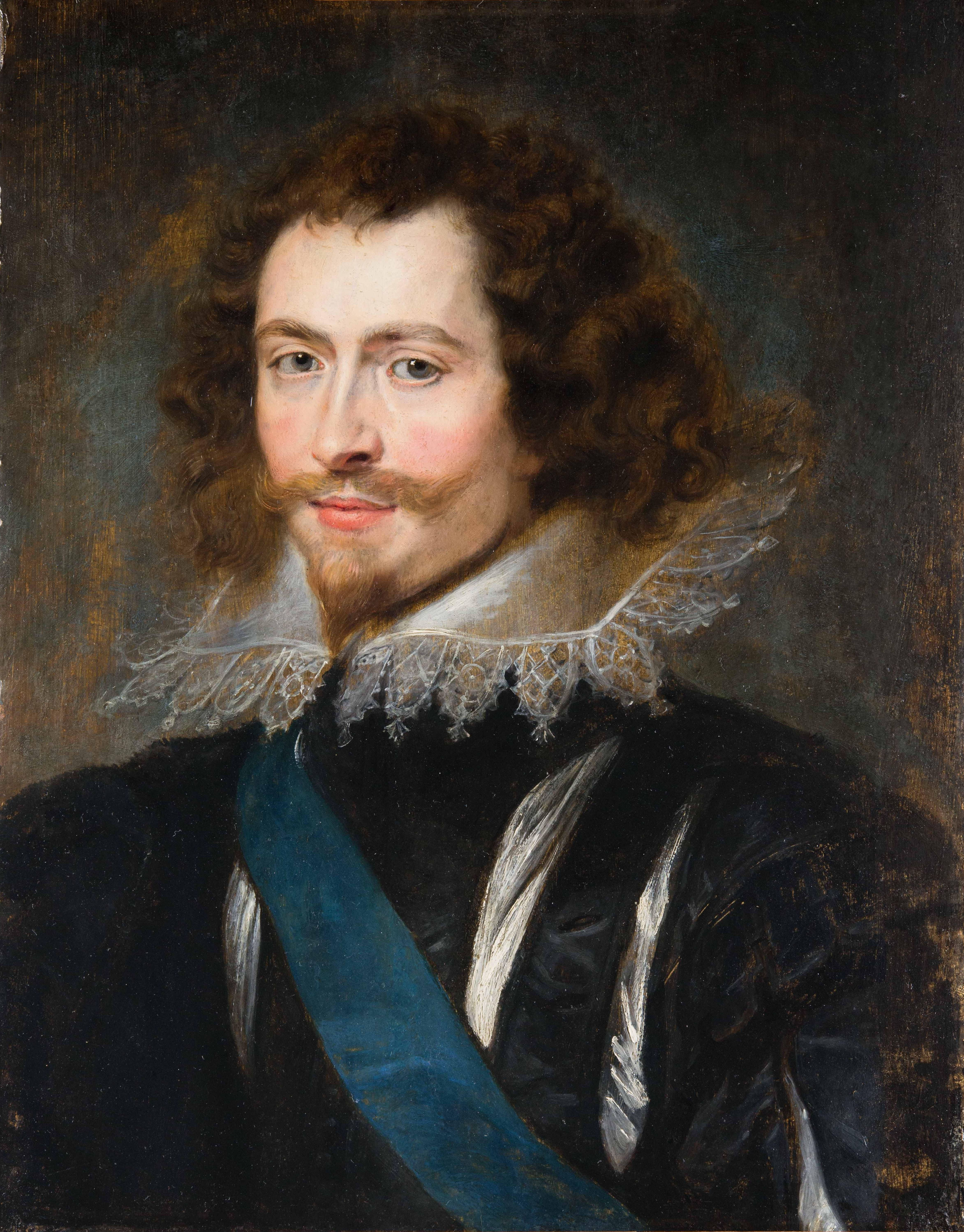
The Duke of Buckingham by the workshop of Rubens (1617–1628)

Favourites inevitably tended to incur the envy and loathing of the rest of the nobility, and monarchs were sometimes obliged by political pressure to dismiss or execute them; in the Middle Ages nobles often rebelled in order to seize and kill a favourite. Too close a relationship between monarch and favourite was seen as a breach of the natural order and hierarchy of society. Since many favourites had flamboyant "over-reaching" personalities, they often led the way to their own downfall with their rash behaviour. As the opinions of the gentry and bourgeoisie grew in importance, they also often strongly disliked favourites. Dislike from all classes could be especially intense in the case of favourites who were elevated from humble, or at least minor, backgrounds by royal favour. Titles and estates were usually given lavishly to favourites, who were compared to mushrooms because they sprang up suddenly overnight, from a bed of excrement. The King's favourite Piers Gaveston is a "night-grown mushrump" (mushroom) to his enemies in Christopher Marlowe's Edward II.

Their falls could be even more sudden, but after about 1650, executions tended to give way to quiet retirement. Favourites who came from the higher nobility, such as Leicester, Lerma, Olivares, and Oxenstierna, were often less resented and lasted longer. Successful minister-favourites also usually needed networks of their own favourites and relatives to help them carry out the work of government – Richelieu had his "créatures" and Olivares his "hechuras". Oxenstierna and William Cecil, who both died in office, successfully trained their sons to succeed them.

The favourite can often not be easily distinguished from the successful royal administrator, who at the top of the tree certainly needed the favour of the monarch, but the term is generally used of those who first came into contact with the monarch through the social life of the court, rather than the business of politics or administration. Figures like William Cecil and Jean-Baptiste Colbert, whose accelerated rise through the administrative ranks owed much to their personal relations with the monarch, but who did not attempt to behave like grandees of the nobility, were also often successful. Elizabeth I had Cecil as Secretary of State and later Lord High Treasurer from the time she ascended the throne in 1558 until his death 40 years later. She had more colourful relationships with several courtiers; the most lasting and intimate one was with Robert Dudley, Earl of Leicester, who was also a leading politician. Only in her last decade was the position of the Cecils, father and son, challenged, by Robert Devereux, 2nd Earl of Essex, when he fatally attempted a coup against the younger Cecil.

Cardinal Wolsey was one figure who rose through the administrative hierarchy, lived extremely ostentatiously, then fell suddenly from power. In the Middle Ages in particular, many royal favourites were promoted in the church, English examples including Saints Dunstan and Thomas Becket; Bishops William Waynflete, Robert Burnell and Walter Reynolds. Cardinal Granvelle, like his father, was a trusted Habsburg minister who lived grandly, but he was not really a favourite, partly because most of his career was spent away from the monarch.

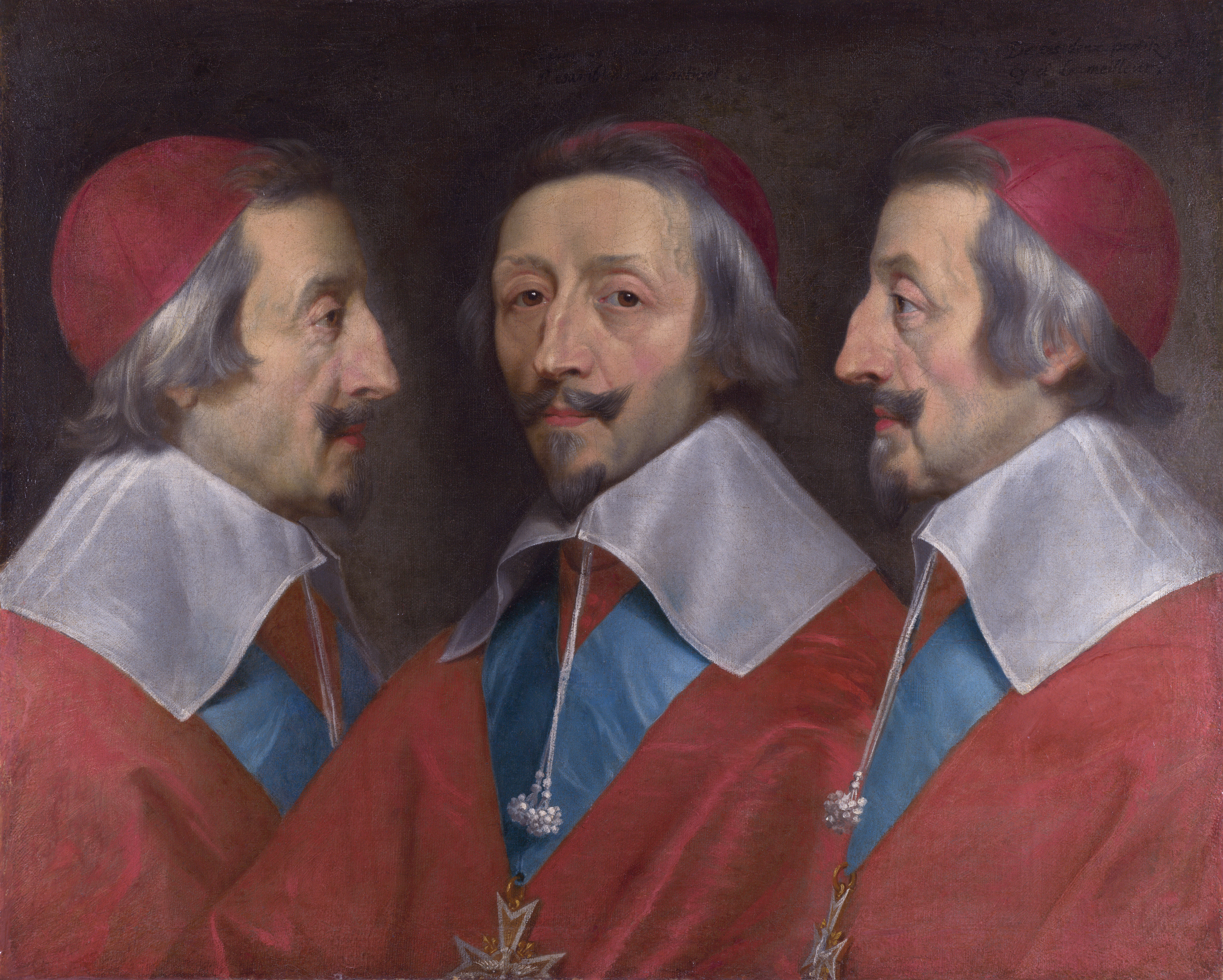
Cardinal Richelieu, one of the most successful from the golden age of the favourite (1642)

Some favourites came from very humble backgrounds: Archibald Armstrong, jester to James VI and I infuriated everyone else at court but managed to retire a wealthy man; unlike Robert Cochrane, said to have been a stonemason who became Earl of Mar before the Scottish nobles revolted against him and hanged him and other low-born favourites of James III of Scotland. Melchior Klesl, minister-favourite of Emperor Matthias (1609–1618) and cardinal, was the son of a Protestant baker in Vienna. Olivier le Daim, the barber of Louis XI, acquired a title and important military commands before he was executed on vague charges brought by nobles shortly after his master died, without the knowledge of the new king. It has been claimed that le Daim's career was the origin of the term, as favori (the French word) first appeared around the time of his death in 1484. Privado in Spanish was older, but was later partly replaced by the term valido; in Spanish, both terms were less derogatory than in French and English. Spain had a succession of validos during the reigns of Philip II, Philip III, and Philip IV.

Such rises from menial positions became progressively harder as the centuries progressed; one of the last families able to jump the widening chasm between servants and nobility was that of Louis XIV's valet, Alexandre Bontemps, whose descendants, holding the office for a further three generations, married into many great families, even eventually including the extended royal family itself. Queen Victoria's John Brown came much too late; the devotion of the monarch and ability to terrorise her household led to hardly any rise in social or economic position.

== Decline ==
In England, the scope for giving political power to a favourite was reduced by the growing importance of Parliament. After the "mushroom" Buckingham was assassinated by John Felton in 1628, Charles I turned to Thomas Wentworth, 1st Earl of Strafford, who had been a leader of Parliamentary opposition to Buckingham and the King, but had become his supporter after Charles made concessions. Strafford can therefore hardly be called a favourite in the usual sense, although his relationship with Charles became very close. He was also from a well-established family, with powerful relations. After several years in power, Strafford was impeached by a Parliament now very hostile to him. When that process failed, it passed a bill of attainder for his execution without trial, and it put enough pressure on Charles that, to his subsequent regret, Charles signed it, and Strafford was executed in 1641. There were later minister-favourites in England, but they knew that the favour of the monarch alone was not sufficient to rule, and most also had careers in Parliament. In 1721, the new office of Prime Minister was created, formalizing the replacement of ministers chosen by the monarch with a political head of government.

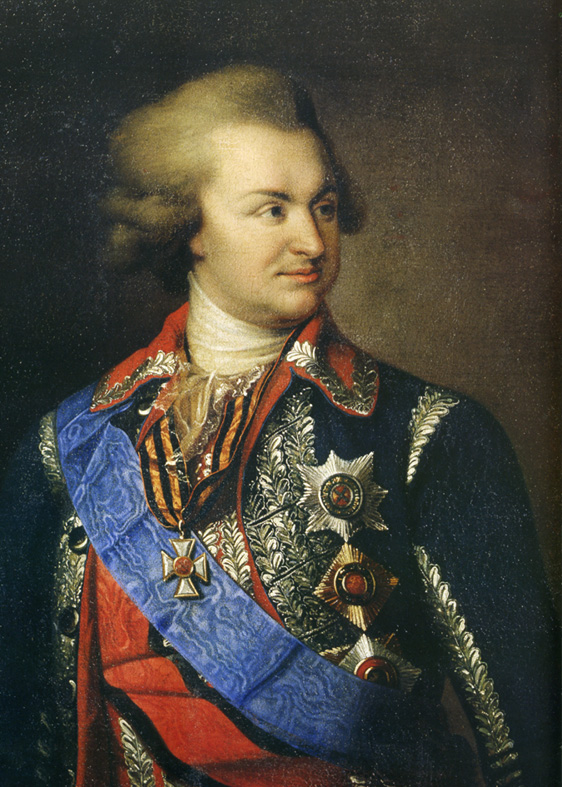
Prince Grigory Potemkin

In France, the movement was in the opposite direction. On the death of Cardinal Mazarin in 1661, the 23-year-old Louis XIV determined that he would rule himself, and he did not allow the delegation of power to ministers that had happened during the previous 40 years. The absolute monarchy pioneered by Cardinal Richelieu, Mazarin's predecessor, was to be led by the monarch himself. Louis had many powerful ministers, notably Jean-Baptiste Colbert, in finances, and François-Michel le Tellier, Marquis de Louvois, the army, but the overall direction was never delegated, and no subsequent French minister ever equalled the power of the two cardinals.

In Spain under the Habsburgs, when Olivares was succeeded by his nephew Luis Méndez de Haro, the last real valido, the control of government into a single pair of hands had already been weakened.

== In literature ==
Favourites were the subject of much contemporary debate, some of it involving a certain amount of danger for the participants. There were many English plays on the subject; amongst the best known are Marlowe's Edward II, in which Piers Gaveston is a leading character, and Sejanus His Fall (1603), for which Ben Jonson was called before the Privy Council, accused of "Popery and treason", as the play was claimed by his enemies to contain allusions to the contemporary court of James I of England. Sejanus, whose career in Ancient Rome under Tiberius was vividly described by Tacitus, was the subject of numerous works all around Europe. Shakespeare was more cautious, and with the exceptions of Falstaff, badly disappointed in his hopes of becoming a favourite, and Cardinal Wolsey in Henry VIII, he gives no major parts to favourites.

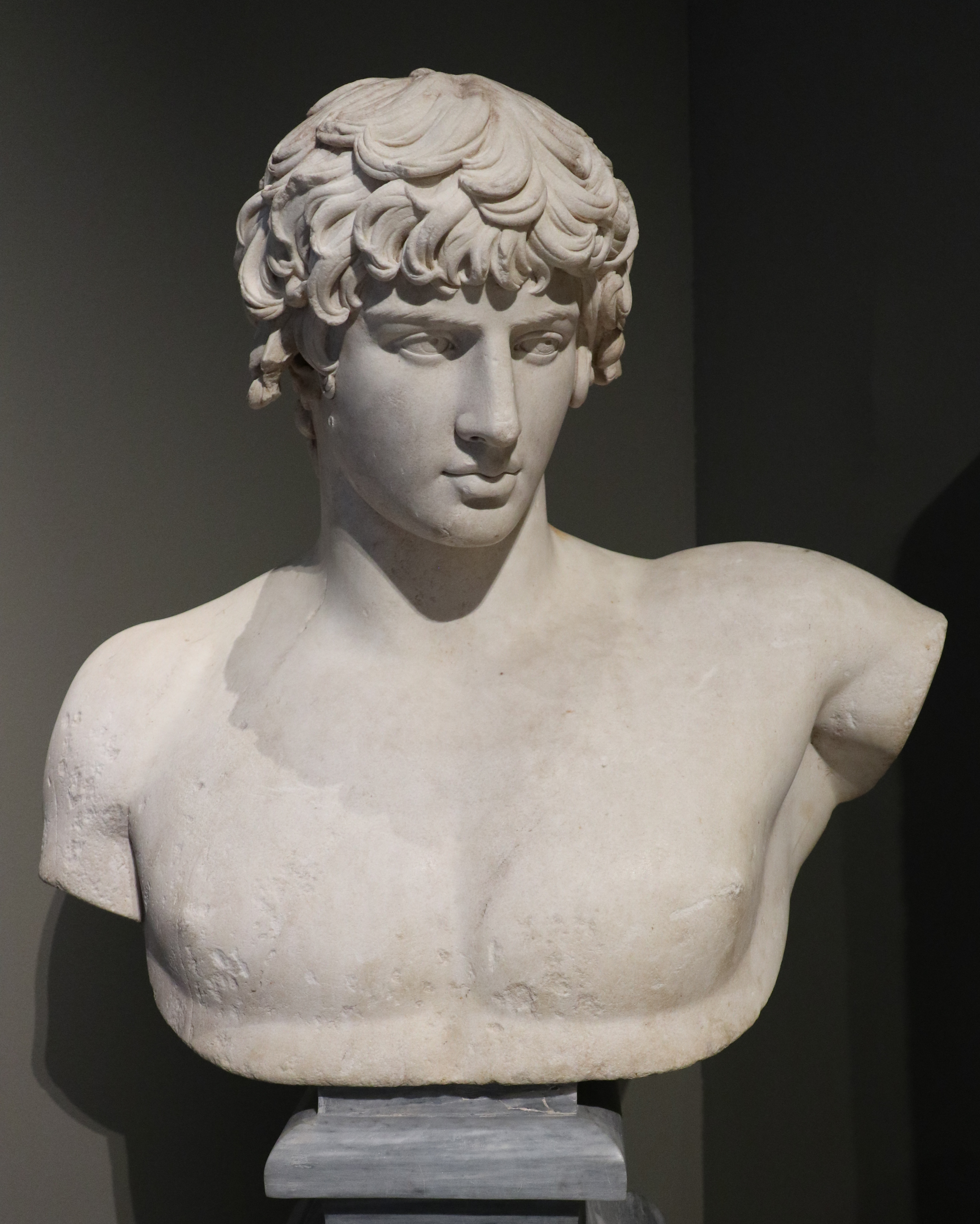
Bust of Antinous from Patras (National Archaeological Museum of Athens)

Francis Bacon, almost a favourite himself, devoted much of his essay On Friendship to the subject, writing as a rising politician under Elizabeth I:

It is a strange thing to observe, how high a rate great kings and monarchs do set upon this fruit of friendship, whereof we speak: So great, as they purchase it, many times, at the hazard of their own safety and greatness. For princes, in regard of the distance of their fortune from that of their subjects and servants, cannot gather this fruit, except (to make themselves capable thereof) they raise some persons to be, as it were, companions and almost equals to themselves, which many times sorteth to inconvenience. The modern languages give unto such persons the name of favourites, or privadoes ... . And we see plainly that this hath been done, not by weak and passionate princes only, but by the wisest and most politic that ever reigned; who have oftentimes joined to themselves some of their servants; whom both themselves have called friends, and allowed other likewise to call them in the same manner; using the word which is received between private men. (Note: Published 1597, perhaps the earliest use of the word in English, it is missed by the OED, who give the Shakespeare use quoted above, perhaps written in 1598.)

Lord Macaulay wrote in 1844 of George III's old tutor, John Stuart, who became Prime Minister: "He was a favourite, and favourites have always been odious in this country. No mere favourite had been at the head of the government since the dagger of Felton had reached the heart of the Duke of Buckingham".

== Study of the subject ==
In 1974 Jean Bérenger published "Pour une enquête européenne, l'histoire du ministeriat au XVIIe siècle" in Annales, a seminal study on the subject. According to Bérenger, the simultaneous success of minister-favourites in several monarchies of the 17th-century was not coincidental, but reflected some change that was taking place at the time. J.H. Elliott's and Laurence Brockliss's work (which resulted in a collection of essays, The World of the Favourite), undertaken to explore the matter put forward by Bérenger, became the most important comparative treatment of this subject.

== Notable favourites ==
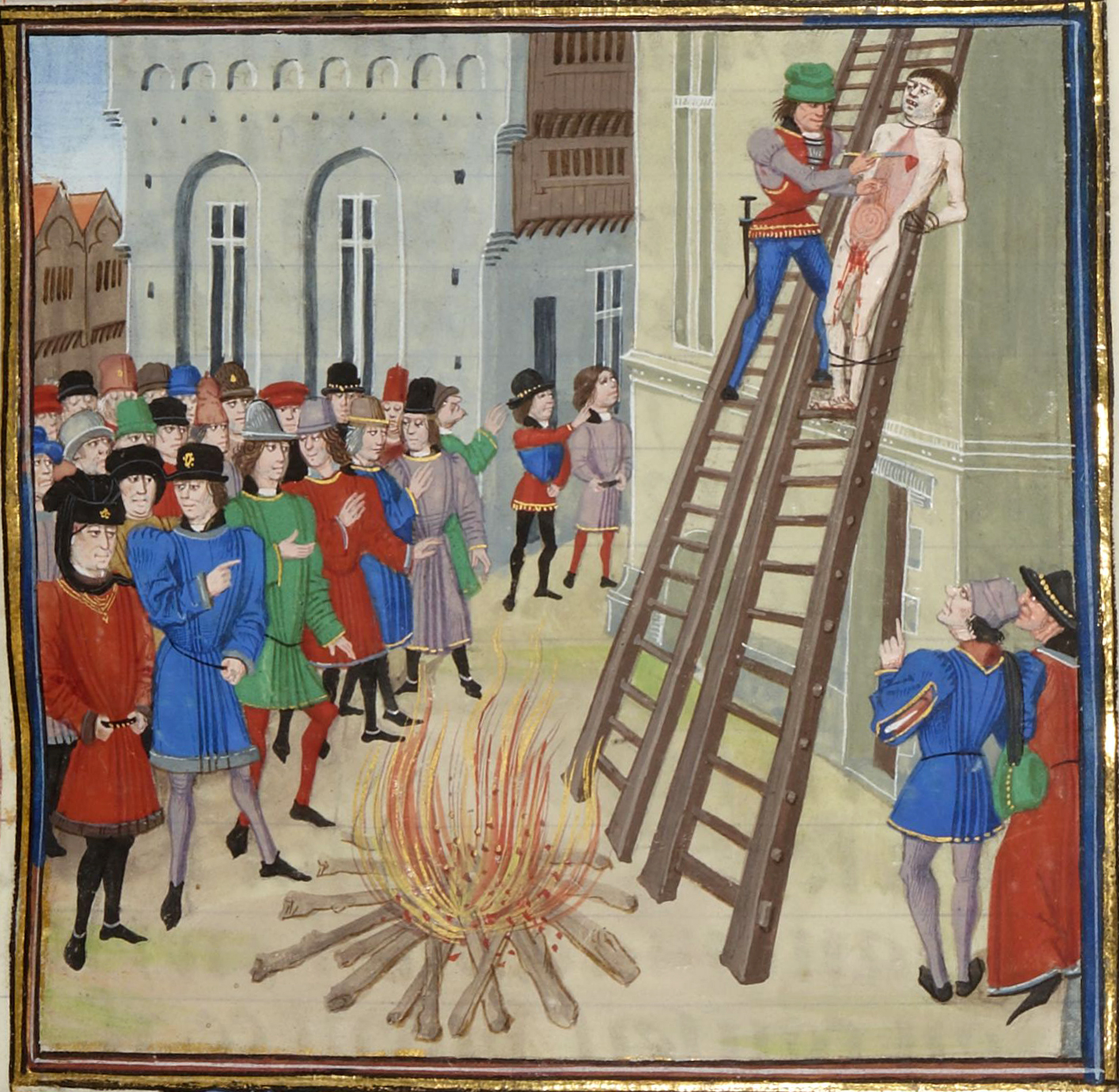
The execution of Hugh Despenser the Younger, from a manuscript of Froissart

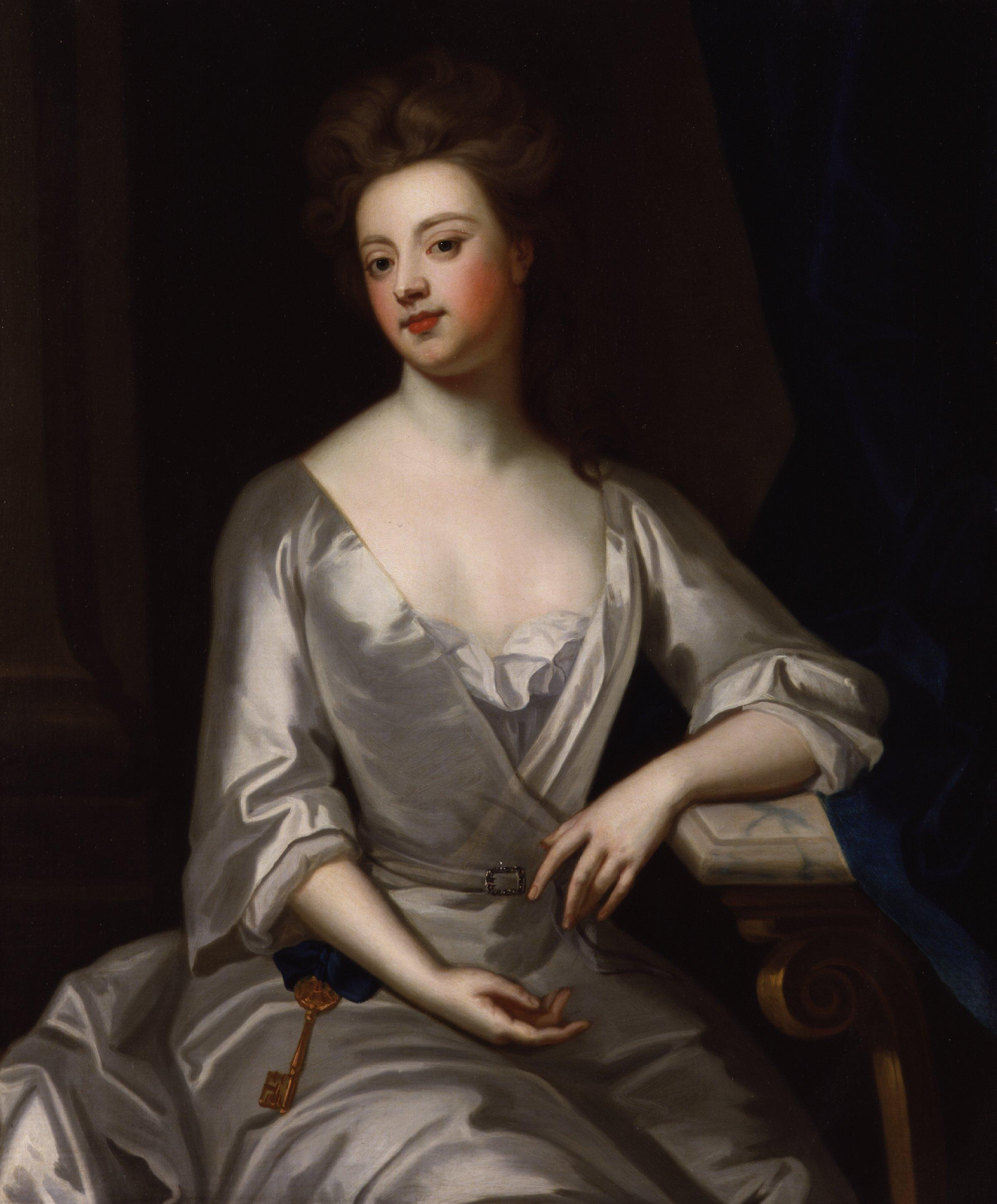
Sarah Churchill, Duchess of Marlborough wearing the symbol of her office and authority: the gold key. Sir Godfrey Kneller, 1702

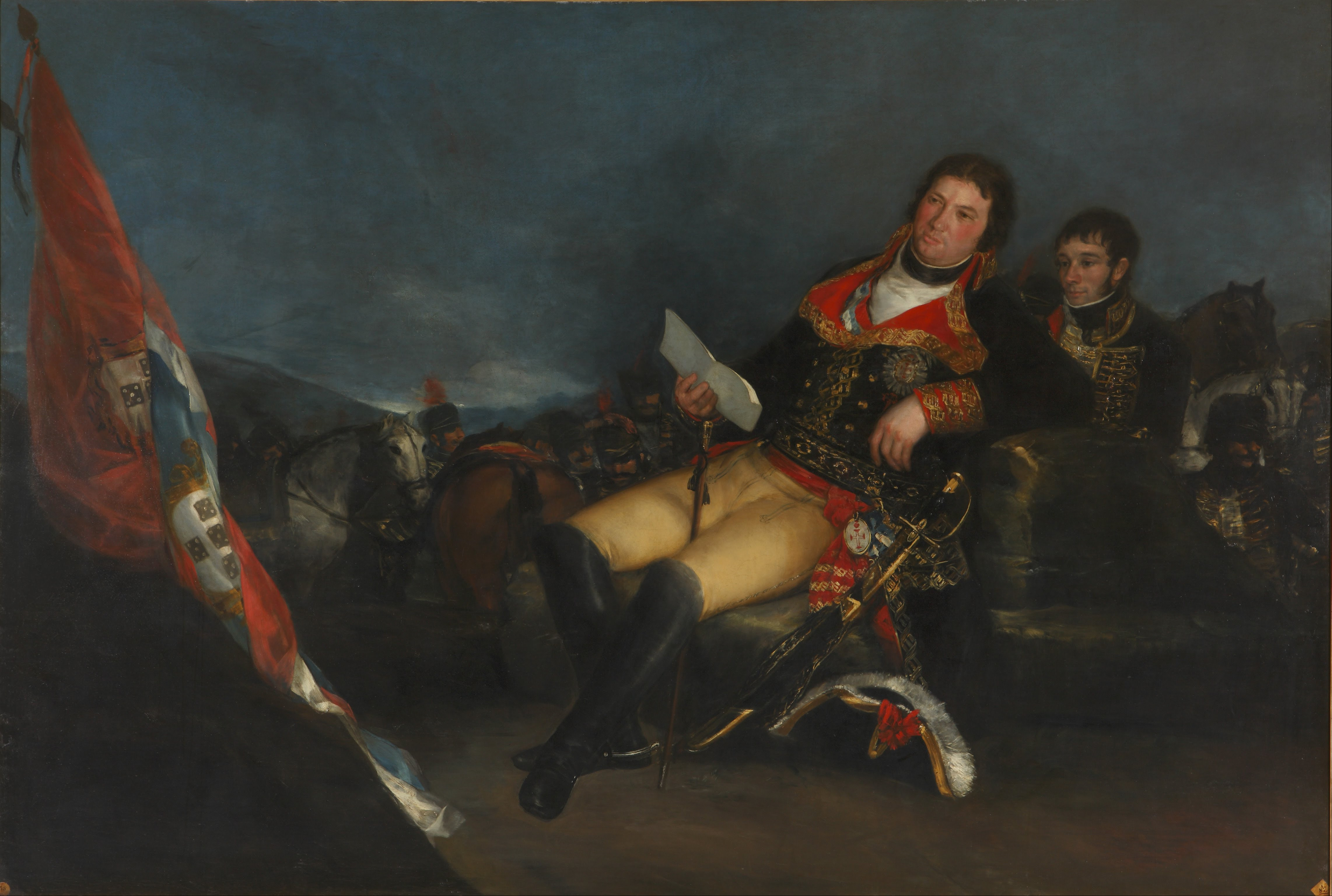
Manuel de Godoy, Príncipe de la Paz, portrait by Goya.

- Biblical figures with many elements of the favourite are David (of Saul) and Joseph (of a pharaoh)
- Hephaestion, favourite of Alexander the Great (4th century BCE)
- Ji Ru, favourite of Emperor Gaozu of Han China (2nd century BCE)
- Hong Yu, favourite of Emperor Hui of Han
- Sejanus, favourite of Tiberius, who executed him in 31
- Kapilar, a Tamil poet and alleged favourite of Vel Pari, died by vatakkiruttal around 125 CE at Kabilar Kundru after his beloved's death
- Antinous, favourite of Emperor Hadrian, d. 130
- Cleander, freedman favourite of Commodus, who executed him in 190
- Basil I the Macedonian, born a peasant, became a favourite of Michael III, who raised him to co-emperor of the Byzantine Empire. Basil later had Michael killed and succeeded as sole emperor, founding the Macedonian dynasty
- Malik Kafur, an enslaved Gujarati Hindu who was then converted to Islam during the Islamic conquest of Gujarat, became the favourite of the Sultan of Delhi Alauddin Khalji. After Alauddin's death, he became the power behind the throne by appointing Alauddin's minor son Shihabuddin Omar as Sultan and was murdered in a palace coup orchestrated by Omar's elder brother Qutubuddin Mubarak Shah.
- Khusrao Khan, an enslaved Hindu who converted to Islam during Alauddin's conquest of Malwa, who, alongside his brother Husamuddin, became the favourite and lovers of Qutubuddin Mubarak Shah. Khan managed to assassinate Mubarak Shah and briefly became the Sultan, but was soon murdered by the Turko-Mongol nobility led by Ghiyasuddin Tughlaq, founding the Tughlaq dynasty.
- Ibn Ammar came to the attention of the Muslim ruler of the taifa of Seville through his poetry and skill at chess, but tried to seize part of the kingdom for himself, and was strangled personally by his monarch in 1086
- Piers Gaveston, 1st Earl of Cornwall, possibly the lover of Edward II of England, was given high office, including being Regent when Edward went abroad, but was executed after capture by rebels in 1312
- Hugh Despenser the Younger, also possibly the lover of Edward II, was captured and killed in a rebellion led by Edward's queen in 1326
- Roger Mortimer, favourite and lover of Isabella, who became the defacto ruler of England until he was overthrown in a palace coup orchestrated by Isabella's son, Edward III of England.
- Baburi Andijani, an Uzbek servant for whom Babur harbored intense feelings.
- Bengt Algotsson, favourite of King Magnus Eriksson of Sweden and Norway, was forced into exile following a rebellion and murdered in 1360.
- Álvaro de Luna, favourite of John II of Castile, was executed in 1453 after pressure from the nobility of Castile
- Robert Cochrane, favourite of James III of Scotland, taken by a cabal of nobles led by Archibald "Bell the Cat" Douglas, 5th Earl of Angus and hanged along with his confederates from Lauder bridge
- Pargalı Ibrahim Pasha, favourite of the Ottoman Sultan Suleiman I , who ordered his execution in 1536, possibly on suspicion of treason
- Chang Yŏngsil, favourite of Sejong the Great, who dismissed him from court in 1442.
- Innocenzo Ciocchi del Monte, a favourite of Pope Julius III. Speculation around nature of the relationship between Julius & Innocenzo (whom the former had raised to the position of cardinal-nephew despite his incompetence), in midst of increased sensitivity to clerical abuse of power by the Renaissance Papacy due to the Protestant Reformation, led to accusations of homosexuality.
- Robert Dudley, 1st Earl of Leicester favourite of Elizabeth I of England for 30 years, rumoured lover and long-term candidate for her hand; also a leading patron and statesman. He was succeeded by his stepson Robert Devereux, 2nd Earl of Essex who also courted Elizabeth until his execution in 1601 after an abortive coup
- Birbal, a Hindu favourite of the Mughal Emperor Akbar. He died in 1586 while on his first military campaign to subdue Afghan rebels.
- "Les Mignons" ("the Darlings"), a group of favourites of Henry III of France
- Francisco Goméz de Sandoval y Rojas, Duke of Lerma, died in 1625, the first "valido", a semi-official title for Spanish favourites. He ran Spain for 20 years during the reign of Philip III of Spain before falling from favour and being replaced by Gaspar de Guzmán y Pimentel, Count-Duke of Olivares who ran Spain for a further 20 years, during the reign of the new king, Philip IV of Spain.
- Charles d'Albert, duc de Luynes in France, the mignon of Louis XIII, arranged the murder of the Queen Mother's Marie de Medici's favourite Concino Concini in 1617.
- George Villiers, 1st Duke of Buckingham, very influential politically and assassinated in 1628, was favourite to both James I and his son Charles I. James, who had been effectively orphaned as a baby, and was possibly homosexual, was very prone to dependency on favourites, although whether sexual activity took place remains unclear. Esmé Stewart, 1st Duke of Lennox, 37 to James's 13 when they met, was forced into exile by opponents, and eventually succeeded by Robert Carr, 1st Earl of Somerset; despite titles and wealth, both ended unhappily.
- Fyodor Basmanov, favourite of Ivan the Terrible, Tsar of Russia.
- Axel Oxenstierna ran the government of Sweden, very successfully, for over 40 years during the reign of King Gustavus Adolphus & his daughter Christina until his death in 1654, when his son Eric took over
- Henri Coiffier de Ruzé, Marquis of Cinq-Mars in France, was executed in 1642 after leading a conspiracy against his rival and patron Cardinal Richelieu, who governed France for 18 years
- Cardinal Mazarin, favourite of Louis XIII, governed France for almost 20 years continuing into the minority of his son until his death in 1661; Louis XIV's public decision that he would thenceforward "govern alone" marked the end of the golden age of the favourite
- Luís de Vasconcelos e Sousa, 3rd Count of Castelo Melhor, was the favourite of the mentally-unstable Afonso VI of Portugal; notably, he convinced the king that his mother Luisa de Guzmán was out to steal his throne and, as a result, Afonso had her sent to a convent
- Corfitz Ulfeldt became son-in-law to Christian IV of Denmark before trying to kill him, and then defecting to Swedish service
- Sidney Godolphin, 1st Earl of Godolphin, a transitional figure as a protégé of Charles II of England who also had a successful career in Parliament
- Akkanna and Madanna, 2 Telugu Brahmin brothers who became the favourites of the Sultan of Golconda, Abul Hasan Qutb Shah. The fact of Hindus (who were looked down upon as kafirs) reaching high ranks within the bureaucracy of an Islamic polity scandalized many high-caste Muslims, so the 2 were immediately murdered on the orders of Aurangzeb following the Mughal conquest of Golconda.
- Marie-Anne de la Trémoille, princesse des Ursins (died 1722) through force of character enjoyed extraordinary power successively in the courts of France, Spain and the English Jacobite exiles
- Constantine Phaulkon, Greek first counsellor of King Narai of Ayutthaya; his influences over the King led to the Siamese revolution of 1688
- Sarah Churchill, Duchess of Marlborough, domineering friend of Anne, Queen of Great Britain, eventually supplanted by her cousin Abigail Masham, Baroness Masham
- Alexander Menshikov, lifelong best friend of Peter the Great of Russia, came from the most humble origins and attained enormous power, not least after the Tsar's death, when he was de facto ruler for two years until he was banished to Siberia
- Heinrich von Brühl (1700–1763), greedy, venal and ultimately disastrous Prime Minister of the Electorate of Saxony, who was the favourite of Augustus III of Poland.
- Johann Friedrich Struensee in Denmark, the royal doctor, who ran the government of the schizophrenic Christian VII whilst having an affair with the Queen, before being executed in 1772
- Frederick von Blücher in Denmark, the Adjutant-General and Hofmarschall of Frederick VI of Denmark, whilst possibly having an affair with the Queen
- Heshen, who amassed an enormous fortune during the latter part of the reign of the Qianlong Emperor of Qing China
- Grigory Alexandrovich Potemkin (died 1791) was the lover of the Empress Catherine II of Russia for two years, but continued to have enormous power in the government for a further fifteen
- Platon Alexandrovich Zubov was the last favourite of the Empress Catherine II of Russia. He later took substantial part in the murder of her son and heir
- Count Axel von Fersen the Younger (died 1810), was an alleged lover and trusted friend of the last Queen of France Marie Antoinette
- Marie-Louise, princesse de Lamballe (died 1792) was the dear friend of Marie Antoinette and stayed faithful to her until her death
- Gabrielle de Polastron, Duchesse de Polignac (died 1793) was the favourite of the last queen of France, Marie-Antoinette, and one of the few women that King Louis XVI liked and trusted
- Manuel de Godoy, whose unpopularity, along with Napoleon's dynastic ambitions, led to the abdication of Charles IV of Spain in 1808, after which Godoy spent over 40 years in exile
- Abdul Karim, favourite of Queen Victoria of United Kingdom. Karim's background and proximity with the aging queen raised many contemporary eyebrows, but unlike John Brown, Karim received many gifts and opportunities from the Queen. Karim was banished after Victoria's death. The relationship between Karim and Victoria was dramatized in the film Victoria and Abdul.
- Grigori Rasputin, mystic favourite of the Romanov family of Russia, murdered in 1916
- Choi Soon-sil, favourite of Park Geun-hye, former President of South Korea

=== Mistresses ===
- Margaret Erskine, mistress of James V of Scotland and mother of James Stewart, 1st Earl of Moray
- Diane de Poitiers, mistress of Henry II of France
- Louise de La Vallière, mistress of Louis XIV, succeeded by Madame de Montespan
- Madame de Maintenon refused to become the mistress of Louis XIV, and became his second, morganatic wife.
- Madame de Pompadour, mistress of Louis XV. Through her machinations, she crafted the Franco-Austrian alliance during the Diplomatic Revolution.
- Catherine I of Russia, rose up from being mistress to wife and Empress consort of Peter I, Emperor of Russia. After Peter's death, she became Empress regnant.
- Madame du Barry, later mistress of Louis XV, guillotined during the French Revolution

== See also ==
- Cardinal-nephew
- Hanimefendi
- The Favourite
