= List of prime ministers of the United Kingdom by length of tenure =

This is a list of prime ministers of the United Kingdom by length of tenure. This is based on the difference between dates; if counted by the number of calendar days, the figures would be one day greater for each term served.

The term prime minister appeared in the early eighteenth century as an unofficial title for the leader of the government, usually the head of the Treasury. Jonathan Swift, for example, wrote that in 1713 there had been "those who are now commonly called Prime Minister among us", referring to Sidney Godolphin and Robert Harley, Queen Anne's lord treasurers and chief ministers. Robert Walpole is regarded as the first prime minister; he became First Lord of the Treasury of Great Britain in 1721. This list includes all prime ministers of the Kingdom of Great Britain, the United Kingdom of Great Britain and Ireland, and the modern-day United Kingdom of Great Britain and Northern Ireland.

== Notable lengths ==
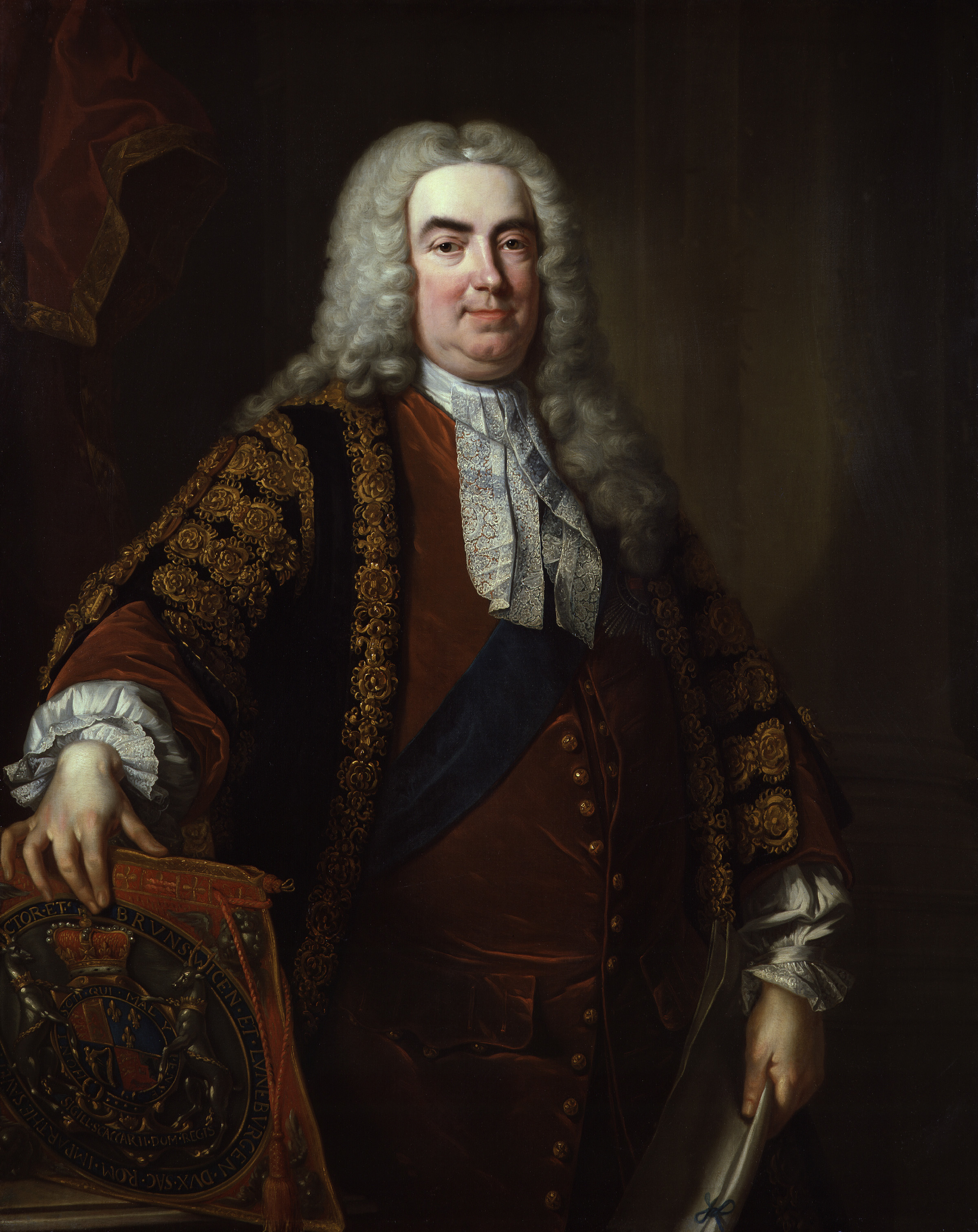
20 years and 315 days: Robert Walpole (1721–1742)
Longest term and longest total tenure

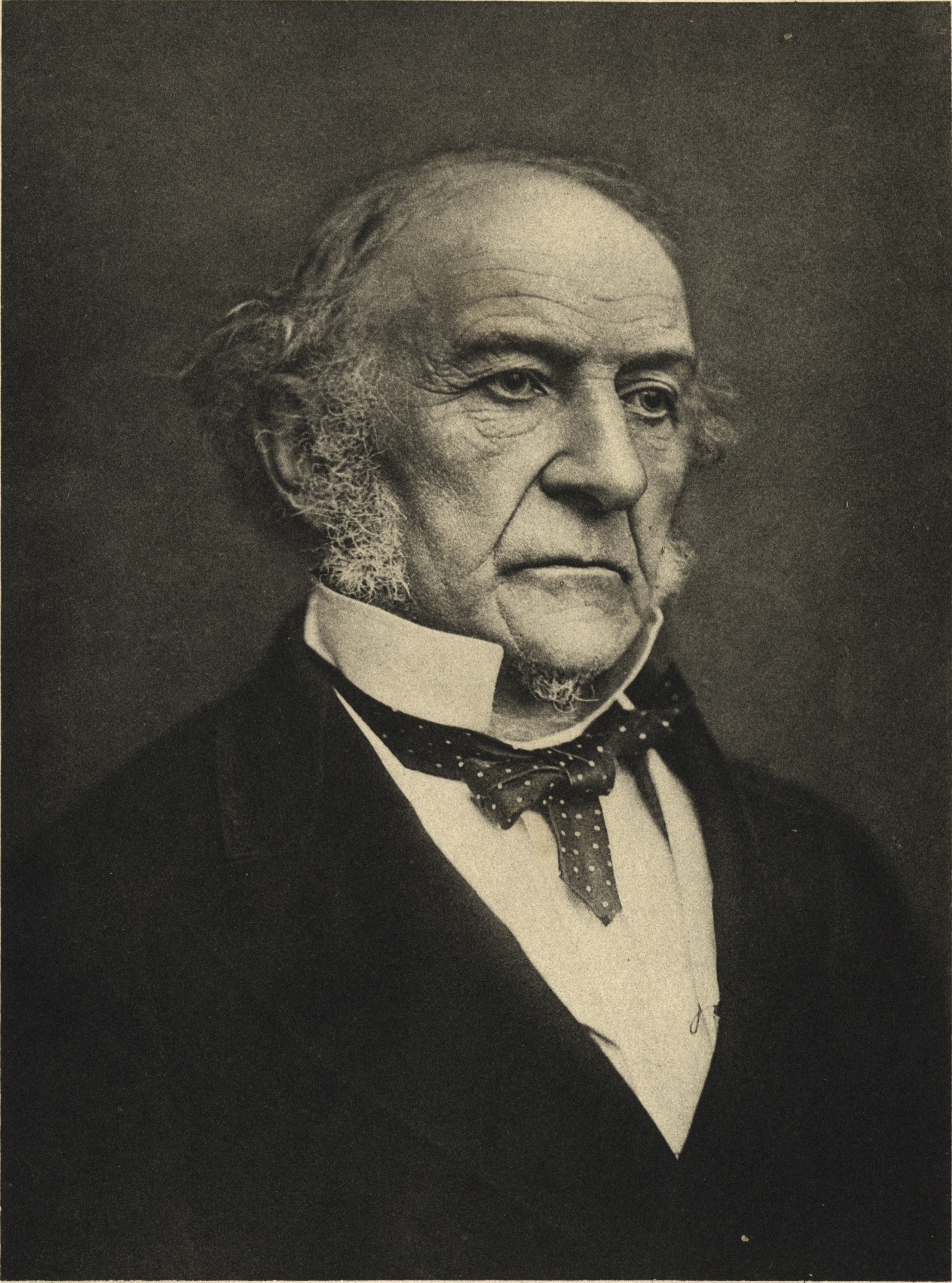
12 years and 130 days: William Ewart Gladstone (1868–1874, 1880–1885, 1886, and 1892–1894)
Most non-consecutive terms

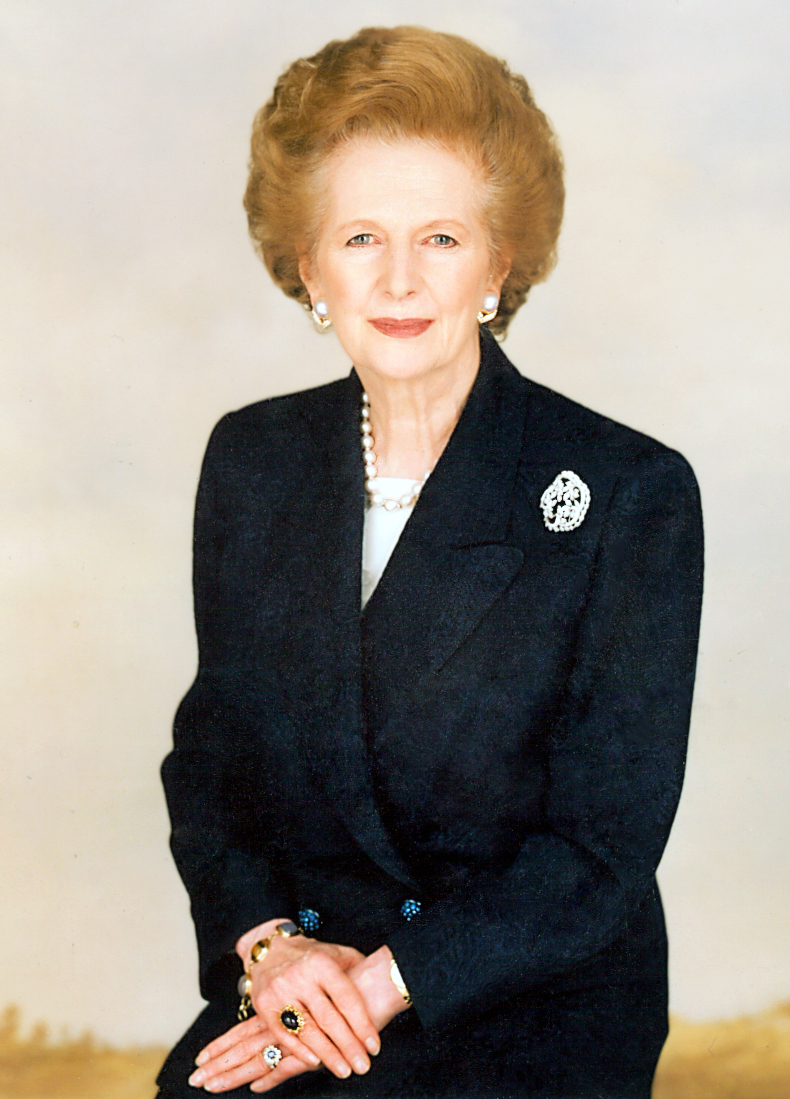
11 years and 209 days: Margaret Thatcher (1979–1990)
Longest-serving prime minister in the 20th century and longest serving female prime minister.

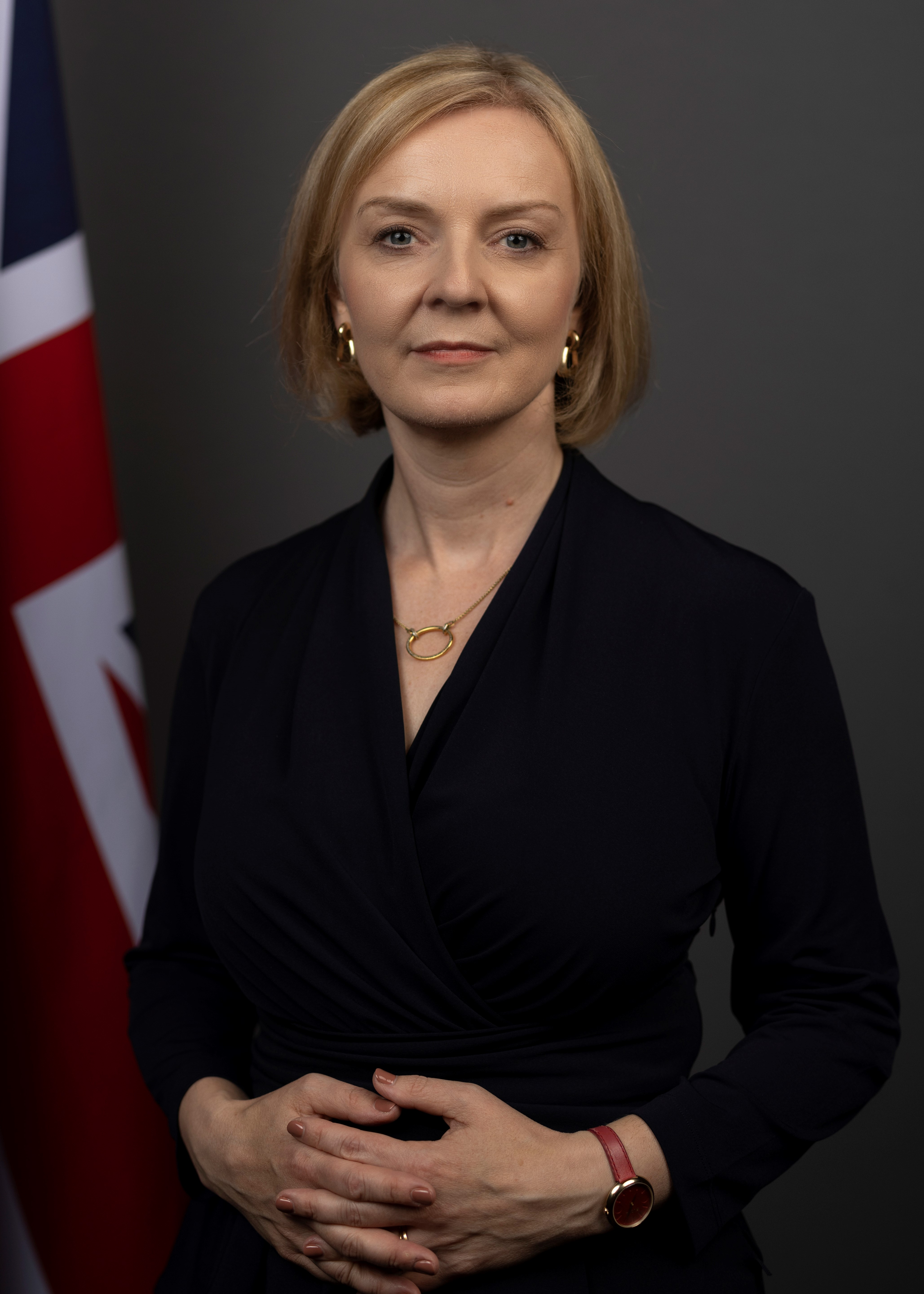
49 days: Liz Truss (2022)
Shortest tenure as prime minister

Of the 58 past prime ministers, nine served more than 10 years while eight served less than a year. Robert Walpole is the only person to have served as prime minister (then Great Britain) for more than two decades. Liz Truss is the shortest-serving prime minister, resigning after seven weeks or 49 days. The previous shortest time served was George Canning, who served for less than four months before dying in office. Margaret Thatcher, in office for 11 years and 208 days between 1979 and 1990, is the longest-serving prime minister in modern history, and the longest-serving prime minister officially referred to as such. William Gladstone is the only person to have served four separate terms.

== List of office holders by tenure ==
Rank	Prime Minister	Tenure length	Tenures	Party	Start	End	Reason for exit	Ref.
1	Sir Robert Walpole	20 years, 314 days	1	Whig	1721	1742	Resigned	
2	William Pitt the Younger	18 years, 343 days	2	Tory (Pittite)	1783	1801	Resigned	
2	William Pitt the Younger	18 years, 343 days	2	Tory (Pittite)	1804	1806	Died	
3	The Earl of Liverpool	14 years, 305 days	1	Tory (Pittite)	1812	1827	Resigned due to illness	
4	The Marquess of Salisbury	13 years, 252 days	3	Conservative	1885	1886	Resigned	
4	The Marquess of Salisbury	13 years, 252 days	3	Conservative	1886	1892	Defeated in election	
4	The Marquess of Salisbury	13 years, 252 days	3	Conservative	1895	1902	Resigned due to illness	
5	William Ewart Gladstone	12 years, 126 days	4	Liberal	1868	1874	Defeated in election	
5	William Ewart Gladstone	12 years, 126 days	4	Liberal	1880	1885	Defeated in election	
5	William Ewart Gladstone	12 years, 126 days	4	Liberal	1886	1886	Resigned	
5	William Ewart Gladstone	12 years, 126 days	4	Liberal	1892	1894	Resigned	
6	Lord North	12 years, 58 days	1	Tory (Northite)	1770	1782	Resigned	
7	Margaret Thatcher	11 years, 208 days	1	Conservative	1979	1990	Resigned	
8	Henry Pelham	10 years, 191 days	1	Whig	1743	1754	Died	
9	Tony Blair	10 years, 56 days	1	Labour	1997	2007	Resigned	
10	The Viscount Palmerston	9 years, 141 days	2	Whig / Liberal	1855	1858	Resigned	
10	The Viscount Palmerston	9 years, 141 days	2	Whig / Liberal	1859	1865	Died	
11	H. H. Asquith	8 years, 244 days	1	Liberal	1908	1916	Resigned	
12	Sir Winston Churchill	8 years, 239 days	2	Conservative	1940	1945	Defeated in election	
12	Sir Winston Churchill	8 years, 239 days	2	Conservative	1951	1955	Resigned due to illness	
13	Harold Wilson	7 years, 279 days	2	Labour	1964	1970	Defeated in election	
13	Harold Wilson	7 years, 279 days	2	Labour	1974	1976	Resigned	
14	The Duke of Newcastle	7 years, 205 days	2	Whig	1754	1756		
14	The Duke of Newcastle	7 years, 205 days	2	Whig	1757	1762	Dismissed by King George III	
15	Stanley Baldwin	7 years, 82 days	3	Conservative	1923	1924	Lack of majority after election	
15	Stanley Baldwin	7 years, 82 days	3	Conservative	1924	1929	Defeated in election	
15	Stanley Baldwin	7 years, 82 days	3	Conservative	1935	1937	Resigned	
16	Benjamin Disraeli	6 years, 339 days	2	Conservative	1868	1868	Defeated in election	
16	Benjamin Disraeli	6 years, 339 days	2	Conservative	1874	1880	Defeated in election	
17	Ramsay MacDonald	6 years, 289 days	2	Labour	1924	1924	Defeated in election	
17	Ramsay MacDonald	6 years, 289 days	2	Labour / National Labour	1929	1935	Resigned due to illness	
18	Harold Macmillan	6 years, 281 days	1	Conservative	1957	1963	Resigned due to illness	
19	The Viscount Melbourne	6 years, 255 days	2	Whig	1834	1834	Resigned	
19	The Viscount Melbourne	6 years, 255 days	2	Whig	1835	1841	Defeated in election	
20	John Major	6 years, 155 days	1	Conservative	1990	1997	Defeated in election	
21	Lord John Russell	6 years, 110 days	2	Whig / Liberal	1846	1852	Defeated in election	
21	Lord John Russell	6 years, 110 days	2	Whig / Liberal	1865	1866	Resigned	
22	Clement Attlee	6 years, 92 days	1	Labour	1945	1951	Defeated in election	
23	David Cameron	6 years, 63 days	1	Conservative	2010	2016	Resigned	
24	David Lloyd George	5 years, 317 days	1	Liberal	1916	1922	Resigned	
25	Sir Robert Peel	5 years, 57 days	2	Conservative	1834	1835	Defeated in election	
25	Sir Robert Peel	5 years, 57 days	2	Conservative	1841	1846	Resigned	
26	The Earl of Derby	3 years, 280 days	3	Conservative	1852	1852		
26	The Earl of Derby	3 years, 280 days	3	Conservative	1858	1859		
26	The Earl of Derby	3 years, 280 days	3	Conservative	1866	1868	Resigned due to illness	
27	Edward Heath	3 years, 259 days	1	Conservative	1970	1974	Defeated in election	
28	The Earl Grey	3 years, 229 days	1	Whig	1830	1834	Resigned	
29	Arthur Balfour	3 years, 145 days	1	Conservative	1902	1905	Resigned	
30	The Duke of Portland	3 years, 82 days	2	Whig / Tory (Pittite)	1783	1783		
30	The Duke of Portland	3 years, 82 days	2	Whig / Tory (Pittite)	1807	1809	Resigned due to illness	
31	Henry Addington	3 years, 54 days	1	Tory (Pittite)	1801	1804	Replaced	
32	Boris Johnson	3 years, 44 days	1	Conservative	2019	2022	Resigned	
33	James Callaghan	3 years, 29 days	1	Labour	1976	1979	Defeated in election	
34	Theresa May	3 years, 11 days	1	Conservative	2016	2019	Resigned	
35	Neville Chamberlain	2 years, 348 days	1	Conservative	1937	1940	Resigned	
36	The Duke of Wellington	2 years, 320 days	2	Tory	1828	1830	Replaced	
36	The Duke of Wellington	2 years, 320 days	2	Tory	1834	1834	Caretaker ministry	
37	Gordon Brown	2 years, 318 days	1	Labour	2007	2010	Defeated in election	
38	Spencer Perceval	2 years, 221 days	1	Tory (Pittite)	1809	1812	Assassinated	
39	Sir Henry Campbell-Bannerman	2 years, 122 days	1	Liberal	1905	1908	Resigned due to illness	
40	George Grenville	2 years, 85 days	1	Whig (Grenvillite)	1763	1765	Replaced	
41	The Earl of Chatham	2 years, 76 days	1	Whig (Chathamite)	1766	1768	Resigned due to illness	
42	The Earl of Aberdeen	2 years, 42 days	1	Peelite	1852	1855	Resigned	
43	Sir Keir Starmer	2 years, 15 days	1	Labour	2024	2026	Resigned	
44	Sir Anthony Eden	1 year, 279 days	1	Conservative	1955	1957	Resigned due to illness	
45	Rishi Sunak	1 year, 254 days	1	Conservative	2022	2024	Defeated in election	
46	The Earl of Wilmington	1 year, 119 days	1	Whig	1742	1743	Died	
47	The Marquess of Rockingham	1 year, 113 days	2	Whig (Rockinghamite)	1765	1766	Resigned	
47	The Marquess of Rockingham	1 year, 113 days	2	Whig (Rockinghamite)	1782	1782	Died	
48	The Earl of Rosebery	1 year, 109 days	1	Liberal	1894	1895	Defeated in election	
49	The Duke of Grafton	1 year, 106 days	1	Whig (Chathamite)	1768	1770	Resigned	
50	The Lord Grenville	1 year, 42 days	1	Whig	1806	1807	Replaced	
51	Sir Alec Douglas-Home	363 days	1	Conservative (Scot. Unionist)	1963	1964	Defeated in election	
52	The Earl of Bute	317 days	1	Tory	1762	1763	Resigned	
53	The Earl of Shelburne	266 days	1	Whig (Chathamite)	1782	1783	Replaced	
54	The Duke of Devonshire	225 days	1	Whig	1756	1757	Replaced	
55	Andrew Bonar Law	211 days	1	Conservative (Scot. Unionist)	1922	1923	Resigned due to illness	
56	The Viscount Goderich	144 days	1	Tory (Canningite)	1827	1828	Replaced	
57	Andy Burnham	119 days	1	Labour (Lab Co-op)	2026		Incumbent	
58	George Canning	119 days	1	Tory (Canningite)	1827	1827	Died	
59	Liz Truss	49 days	1	Conservative	2022	2022	Resigned	

=== Disputed ===
Prime Minister	Length served	Terms in office	Party	Start and end	Reason for exit
The Earl Waldegrave	4 days	0	Whig	1757	Unsupported
The Earl of Bath	2 days	0	Whig	1746	Unsupported

== See also ==
- History of the prime minister of the United Kingdom
- List of leaders of the opposition of the United Kingdom by length of tenure
- List of prime ministers of Australia by time in office
- List of prime ministers of Canada by time in office
- List of prime ministers of the United Kingdom
- List of prime ministers of the United Kingdom by age
