= Jiru (Han dynasty) =

Personal servant of Han dynasty Emperor Gaozu

Jiru (Chinese: 籍孺; lit. 'a boy surnamed Ji') was a trusted personal servant of Emperor Gaozu, the founder of China's Han dynasty. Louis Crompton claims that Jiru was Gaozu's pillow companion, or homosexual lover, and that Jiru had more access to the emperor than did ministers. Jiru was documented by Sima Qian in the Records of the Grand Historian:

When the Han arose, Emperor Gaozu, for all his coarseness and blunt manners, was won by the charms of a young boy named Ji, and Emperor Hui had a boy favorite named Hong. Neither Ji nor Hong had any particular talent or ability; both won prominence simply by their looks and graces. Day and night they were by the ruler's side, and all the high ministers were obliged to apply to them when they wished to speak to the emperor. 至漢興，高祖至暴抗也，然籍孺以佞幸；孝惠時有閎孺。此兩人非有材能，徒以婉佞貴幸，與上臥起，公卿皆因關說。

Gaozu's example of effectively elevating a male lover to the top of the administration would be followed by nine more rulers of the Han dynasty. This relationship was especially noted because Gaozu was a former brigand with coarse manners, while Jiru was considered elegant.
