= Hong Ru =

Hong Ru (閎孺) (also Hong Yu, Hong Jiru) (fl. c. 190 BCE) was the favorite companion of the Chinese Emperor Hui of Han. He and the emperor were also reputed to possibly be lovers. Hong Ru had much influence with the emperor, and his dress and cosmetics were imitated by other courtiers in an attempt to impress the emperor. These noblemen began wearing feathers in their hats, powdering their faces, and dangling sea shells from their clothes. Hong Yu was documented by China's Grand Historian Sima Qian.

== Sources ==
- Homosexuality and Civilization by Louis Crompton
