= History of the prime minister of the United Kingdom =

The position of Prime Minister of the United Kingdom was not created as a result of a single action; it evolved slowly and organically over three hundred years due to numerous Acts of Parliament, political developments, and accidents of history.

== Foundations ==
For the various personages who presided over the government of England and subsequently Great Britain at the pleasure of the monarch, usually with said monarch's permission, prior to the government under Robert Walpole as prime minister in 1721, see List of English chief ministers.

=== Revolutionary Settlement ===
Because the premiership was not intentionally created, there is no exact date when its evolution began. A meaningful starting point, however, is 1688–89 when James II fled England and the Parliament of England confirmed William III and Mary II as joint constitutional monarchs, enacting legislation that limited their authority and that of their successors: the Bill of Rights (1689), the Mutiny Bill (1689), the Triennial Bill (1694), the Treason Act (1696) and the Act of Settlement (1701). Known collectively as the Revolutionary Settlement, these acts transformed the constitution, shifting the balance of power from the Sovereign to Parliament. Once the office of Prime Minister was created, they also provided the basis for its evolution.

=== Treasury Bench ===
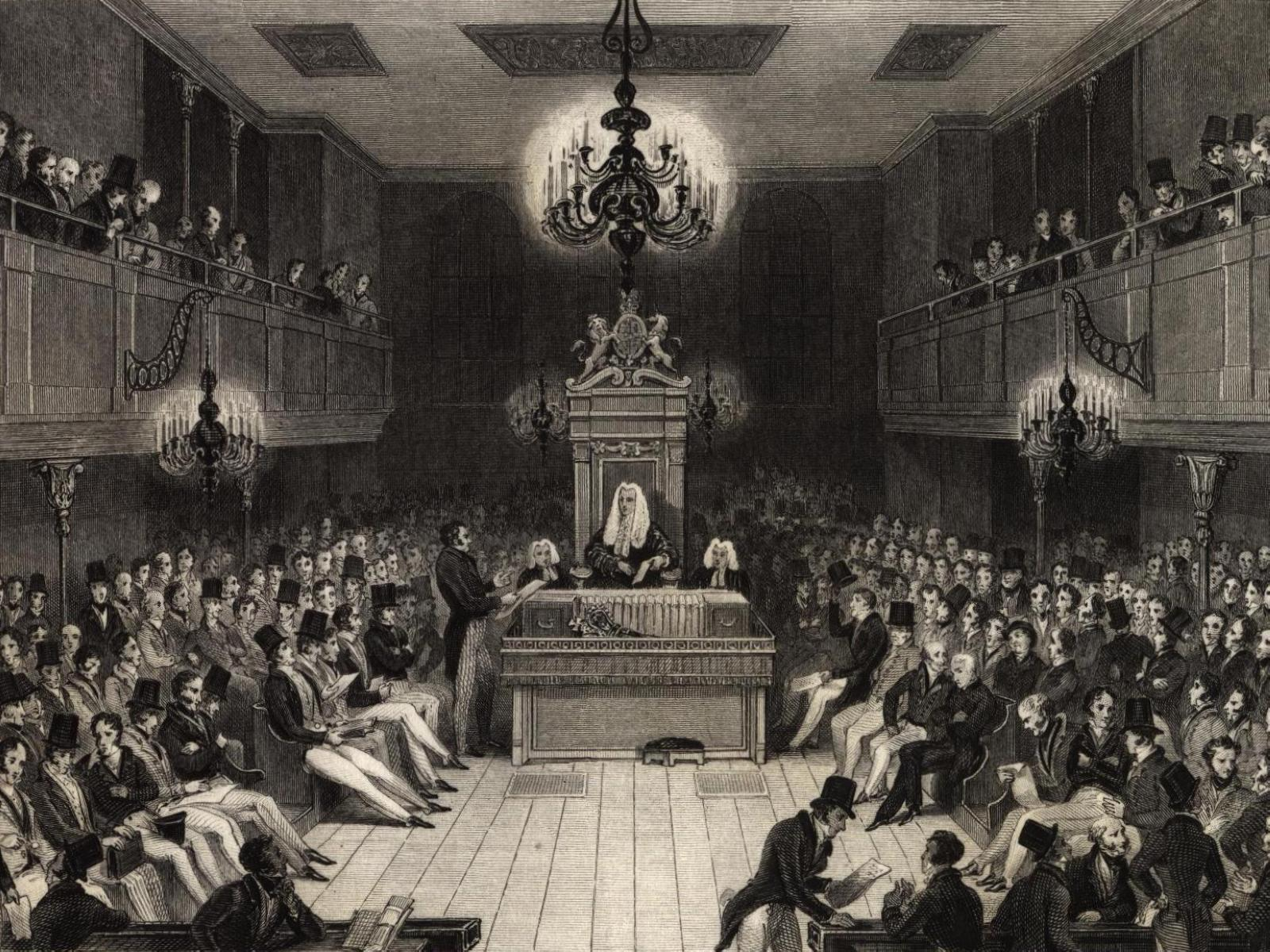
Late in the 17th century Treasury Ministers began to attend the Commons regularly. They were given a reserved place, called the Treasury Bench, to the Speaker's right where the prime minister and senior Cabinet members sit today.

The Revolutionary Settlement gave the Commons control over finances and legislation and changed the relationship between the executive and the legislature. For want of money, sovereigns had to summon Parliament annually and could no longer dissolve or prorogue it without its advice and consent. Parliament became a permanent feature of political life. The veto fell into disuse because sovereigns feared that if they denied legislation, Parliament would deny them money. No sovereign has denied royal assent since Queen Anne vetoed the Scottish Militia Bill in 1708; even then, this was only done on the advice of her government, the last true veto being exercised by William III against the Qualifications Bill in 1696.

Treasury officials and other department heads were drawn into Parliament serving as liaisons between it and the sovereign. Ministers had to present the government's policies, and negotiate with Members to gain the support of the majority; they had to explain the government's financial needs, suggest ways of meeting them and give an account of how money had been spent. The Sovereign's representatives attended Commons sessions so regularly that they were given reserved seats at the front, known as the Treasury Bench. This is the beginning of "unity of powers": the sovereign's ministers (the Executive) became leading members of Parliament (the Legislature). Today, the prime minister (First Lord of the Treasury), the chancellor of the Exchequer (responsible for the budget) and other senior members of the Cabinet sit on the Treasury bench and present policies in much the same way ministers did late in the 17th century.

=== Standing Order 66 ===
After the Revolution, there was a constant threat that non-government members of Parliament would ruin the country's finances by proposing ill-considered money bills. Vying for control to avoid chaos, the Crown's ministers gained an advantage in 1706, when the Commons informally declared, "That this House will receive no petition for any sum of money relating to public Service, but what is recommended from the Crown." On 11 June 1713, this non-binding rule became Standing Order 66: that "the Commons would not vote money for any purpose, except on a motion of a minister of the Crown." Standing Order 66 remains in effect today (though renumbered as no. 48), essentially unchanged for more than three hundred years.

Empowering ministers with sole financial initiative had an immediate and lasting impact. Apart from achieving its intended purpose – to stabilise the budgetary process – it gave the Crown a leadership role in the Commons; and, the lord treasurer assumed a leading position among ministers.

The power of financial initiative was not, however, absolute. Only ministers might initiate money bills, but Parliament now reviewed and consented to them. Standing Order 66 therefore represents the beginnings of Ministerial responsibility and accountability.

The term "Prime Minister" appears at this time as an unofficial title for the leader of the government, usually the head of the Treasury. Jonathan Swift, for example, wrote that in 1713 there had been "those who are now commonly called Prime Minister among us", referring to Sidney Godolphin, 1st Earl of Godolphin and Robert Harley, Queen Anne's Lord Treasurers and chief ministers. Since 1721, every head of the Sovereign's government – with one exception in the 18th century (William Pitt the Elder) and one in the 19th (Lord Salisbury) – has been First Lord of the Treasury.

=== Beginnings of the prime minister's party leadership ===
Political parties first appeared during the Exclusion Crisis of 1678–1681. The Whigs, who believed in limited monarchy, wanted to exclude James, Duke of York, from succeeding to the throne because he was a Roman Catholic. The Tories, who believed in the "Divine Right of Kings", defended James's hereditary claim.

Political parties were not well organised or disciplined in the 17th century. They were more like factions, with "members" drifting in and out, collaborating temporarily on issues when it was to their advantage, then disbanding when it was not. A major deterrent to the development of opposing parties was the idea that there could only be one "King's Party" and to oppose it would be disloyal or even treasonous. This idea lingered throughout the 18th century. Nevertheless it became possible at the end of the 17th century to identify Parliaments and Ministries as being either "Whig" or "Tory" in composition.

=== Cabinet ===
The modern prime minister is also the leader of the Cabinet. A convention of the constitution, the modern Cabinet is a group of ministers who formulate policies. As the political heads of government departments Cabinet Ministers ensure that policies are carried out by permanent civil servants. Although the modern prime minister selects ministers, appointment still rests with the sovereign. With the prime minister as its leader, the Cabinet forms the executive branch of government. (Note: Once in office, the prime minister fills not only Cabinet level positions but many other government offices (up to 90 appointments), selected mostly from the House of Commons, distributing them to party members, partly as a reward for their loyalty. The power to make so many appointments to government offices is one of the most effective means the prime minister has of maintaining party discipline in the Commons.)

The term "Cabinet" first appears after the Revolutionary Settlement to describe those ministers who conferred privately with the sovereign. The growth of the Cabinet met with widespread complaint and opposition because its meetings were often held in secret and it excluded the ancient Privy Council (of which the Cabinet is formally a committee) from the sovereign's circle of advisers, reducing it to an honorary body. The early Cabinet, like that of today, included the Treasurer and other department heads who sat on the Treasury bench. However, it might also include individuals who were not members of Parliament such as household officers (e.g. the Master of the Horse) and members of the royal family. The exclusion of non-members of Parliament from the Cabinet was essential to the development of ministerial accountability and responsibility.

Both William and Anne appointed and dismissed Cabinet members, attended meetings, made decisions, and followed up on actions. Relieving the Sovereign of these responsibilities and gaining control over the Cabinet's composition was an essential part of evolution of the Premiership. This process began after the Hanoverian Succession. Although George I (1714–1727) attended Cabinet meetings at first, after 1717 he withdrew because he did not speak fluent English and was bored with the discussions. George II (1727–1760) occasionally presided at Cabinet meetings but his successor, George III (1760–1820), is known to have attended only two during his 60-year reign. Thus, the convention that sovereigns do not attend Cabinet meetings was established primarily through royal indifference to the everyday tasks of governance. The prime minister became responsible for calling meetings, presiding, taking notes, and reporting to the Sovereign. These simple executive tasks naturally gave the prime minister ascendancy over his Cabinet colleagues.

Although the first three Hanoverians rarely attended Cabinet meetings they insisted on their prerogatives to appoint and dismiss ministers and to direct policy even if from outside the Cabinet. It was not until late in the 18th century that prime ministers gained control over Cabinet composition (see section Emergence of Cabinet Government below).

=== "One-Party Government" ===
British governments (or ministries) are generally formed by one party. The prime minister and Cabinet are usually all members of the same political party, almost always the one that has a majority of seats in the House of Commons. Coalition governments (a ministry that consists of representatives from two or more parties) and minority governments (a one-party ministry formed by a party that does not command a majority in the Commons) were relatively rare before the 2010 election; between the elections of 2010 and 2019, there was both a coalition and a minority government. "One-party government", as this system is sometimes called, has been the general rule for almost three hundred years.

Early in his reign, William III (1689–1702) preferred "mixed ministries" (or coalitions) consisting of both Tories and Whigs. William thought this composition would dilute the power of any one party and also give him the benefit of differing points of view. However, this approach did not work well because the members could not agree on a leader or on policies, and often worked at odds with each other.

In 1697, William formed a homogeneous Whig ministry. Known as the Junto, this government is often cited as the first true Cabinet because its members were all Whigs, reflecting the majority composition of the Commons.

Anne (1702–1714) followed this pattern but preferred Tory Cabinets. This approach worked well as long as Parliament was also predominantly Tory. However, in 1708, when the Whigs obtained a majority, Anne did not call on them to form a government, refusing to accept the idea that politicians could force themselves on her merely because their party had a majority. She never parted with an entire Ministry or accepted an entirely new one regardless of the results of an election. Anne preferred to retain a minority government rather than be dictated to by Parliament. Consequently, her chief ministers Sidney Godolphin, 1st Earl of Godolphin and Robert Harley, who were called "Prime Minister" by some, had difficulty executing policy in the face of a hostile Parliament.

William's and Anne's experiments with the political composition of the Cabinet illustrated the strengths of one party government and the weaknesses of coalition and minority governments. Nevertheless, it was not until the 1830s that the constitutional convention was established that the Sovereign must select the prime minister (and Cabinet) from the party whose views reflect those of the majority in Parliament. Since then, most ministries have reflected this one party rule.

Despite the "one party" convention, prime ministers may still be called upon to lead either minority or coalition governments. A minority government may be formed as a result of a "hung parliament" in which no single party commands a majority in the House of Commons after a general election or the death, resignation or defection of existing members. By convention, the serving prime minister is given the first opportunity to reach agreements that will allow them to survive a vote of confidence in the House and continue to govern.

In the June 2017 general election, the Conservative Party won a plurality of seats but lost its working majority in the House of Commons. Following the election, Conservative Prime Minister Theresa May negotiated an agreement with the Democratic Unionist Party (DUP), securing confidence-and-supply support for her minority government. The Conservative Party regained a majority in the December 2019 general election under Boris Johnson.

The last minority government before 2017 was led by Labour Prime Minister Harold Wilson for eight months after the February 1974 general election produced a hung parliament. In the October 1974 general election, the Labour Party gained 18 seats, giving Wilson a majority of three.

A hung parliament may also lead to the formation of a coalition government in which two or more parties negotiate a joint programme to command a majority in the Commons. Coalitions have also been formed during times of national crisis such as war. Under such circumstances, the parties agree to temporarily set aside their political differences and to unite to face the national crisis. Coalitions are rare: since 1721, there have been fewer than a dozen.

When the general election of 2010 produced a hung parliament, the Conservative and Liberal Democrat parties agreed to form the Cameron–Clegg coalition, the first coalition in seventy years. The previous coalition in the UK before 2010 was led by Conservative Prime Minister Winston Churchill during most of the Second World War, from May 1940 to May 1945. Clement Attlee, the leader of the Labour Party, served as deputy prime minister. After the general election of 2015, the nation returned to one party government after the Tories won an outright majority.

=== Treasury Commission ===
The premiership is still largely a convention of the constitution; its legal authority is derived primarily from the fact that the prime minister is also First Lord of the Treasury. The connection of these two offices – one a convention, the other a legal office – began with the Hanoverian succession in 1714.

When George I succeeded to the British throne in 1714, his German ministers advised him to leave the office of Lord High Treasurer vacant because those who had held it in recent years had grown overly powerful, in effect, replacing the sovereign as head of the government. They also feared that a Lord High Treasurer would undermine their own influence with the new king. They therefore suggested that he place the office in "commission", meaning that a committee of five ministers would perform its functions together. Theoretically, this dilution of authority would prevent any one of them from presuming to be the head of the government. The king agreed and created the Treasury Commission consisting of the First Lord of the Treasury, the Second Lord, and three Junior Lords.

No one has been appointed Lord High Treasurer since 1714; it has remained in commission for three hundred years. The Treasury Commission ceased to meet late in the 18th century but has survived, albeit with very different functions: the First Lord of the Treasury is now the prime minister, the Second Lord is the Chancellor of the Exchequer (and actually in charge of the Treasury), and the Junior Lords are government Whips maintaining party discipline in the House of Commons; they no longer have any duties related to the Treasury, though when subordinate legislation requires the consent of the Treasury it is still two of the Junior Lords who sign on its behalf. (Note: See e.g. the various orders prescribing fees to be taken in public offices)

== Early prime ministers ==
=== "First" prime minister ===
Since the office evolved rather than being instantly created, it may not be totally clear-cut who the first prime minister was. However, this appellation is traditionally given to Sir Robert Walpole, who became First Lord of the Treasury of Great Britain in 1721.

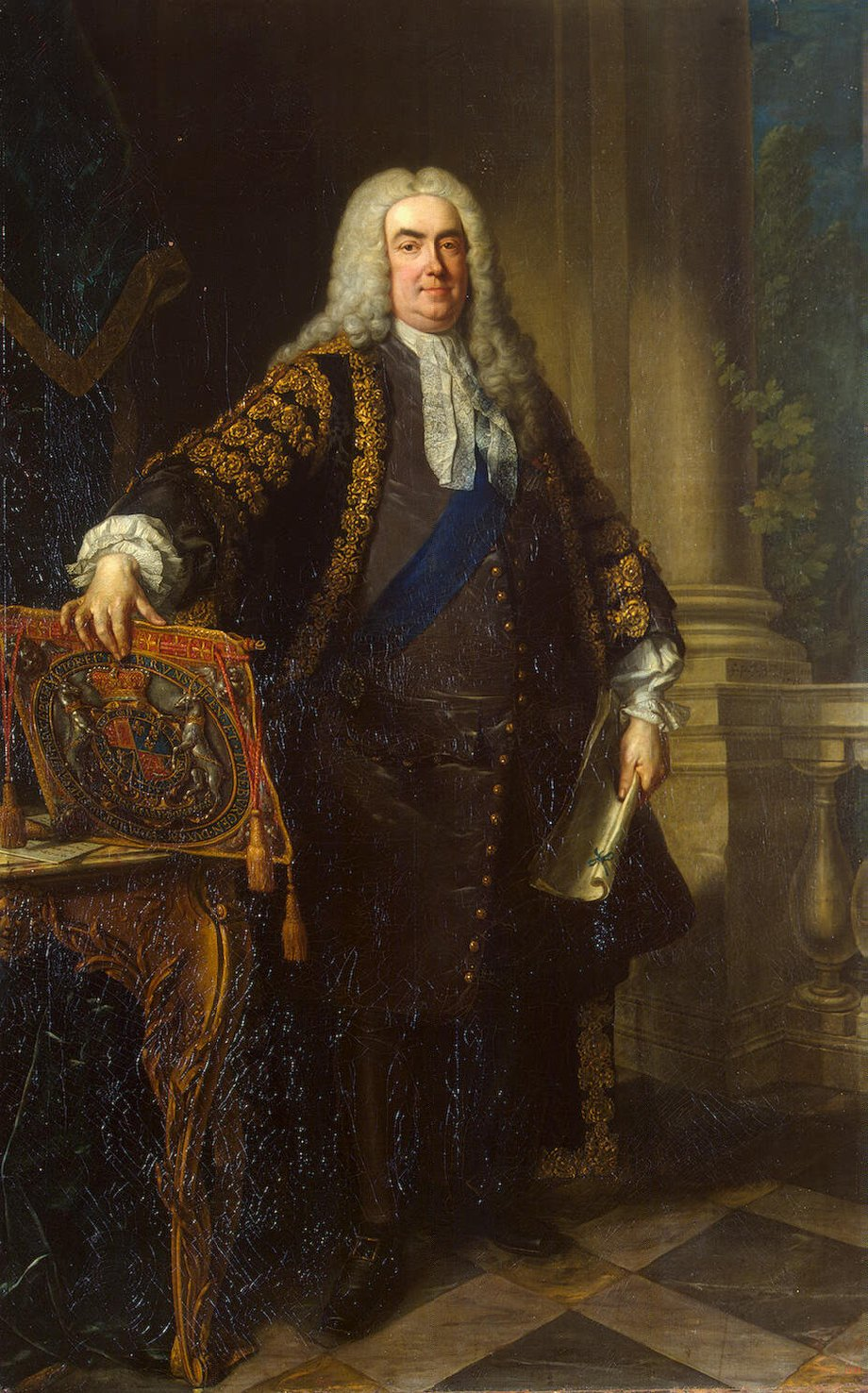
Portrait of Sir Robert Walpole, studio of Jean-Baptiste van Loo, 1740. Walpole is generally considered to have been Britain's first prime minister.

In 1720, the South Sea Company, created to trade in cotton, agricultural goods and slaves, collapsed, causing the financial ruin of thousands of investors and heavy losses for many others, including members of the royal family. King George I called on Robert Walpole, well known for his political and financial acumen, to handle the emergency. With considerable skill and some luck, Walpole acted quickly to restore public credit and confidence, and led the country out of the crisis. A year later, the king appointed him First Lord of the Treasury, Chancellor of the Exchequer, and Leader of the House of Commons – making him the most powerful minister in the government. Ruthless, crude, and hard-working, he had a "sagacious business sense" and was a superb manager of men. At the head of affairs for the next two decades, Walpole stabilised the nation's finances, kept it at peace, made it prosperous, and secured the Hanoverian succession.

Walpole demonstrated for the first time how a chief minister – a prime minister – could be the actual head of the government under the new constitutional framework. First, recognising that the sovereign could no longer govern directly but was still the nominal head of the government, he insisted that he was nothing more than the "King's Servant". Second, recognising that power had shifted to the Commons, he conducted the nation's business there and made it dominant over the Lords in all matters. Third, recognising that the Cabinet had become the executive and must be united, he dominated the other members and demanded their complete support for his policies. Fourth, recognising that political parties were the source of ministerial strength, he led the Whig party and maintained discipline. In the Commons, he insisted on the support of all Whig members, especially those who held office. Finally, he set an example for future prime ministers by resigning his offices in 1742 after a vote of confidence, which he won by just three votes. The slimness of this majority undermined his power, even though he still retained the confidence of the sovereign.

=== Ambivalence and denial ===
For all his contributions, Walpole was not a prime minister in the modern sense. The king – not Parliament – chose him; and the king – not Walpole – chose the Cabinet. Walpole set an example, not a precedent, and few followed his example. For over 40 years after Walpole's fall in 1742, there was widespread ambivalence about the position. In some cases, the prime minister was a figurehead with power being wielded by other individuals; in others there was a reversion to the "chief minister" model of earlier times in which the sovereign actually governed. At other times, there appeared to be two prime ministers. During Great Britain's participation in the Seven Years' War, for example, the powers of government were divided equally between the Duke of Newcastle and William Pitt, leading to them both alternatively being described as Prime Minister. Furthermore, many thought that the title "Prime Minister" usurped the sovereign's constitutional position as "head of the government" and that it was an affront to other ministers because they were all appointed by and equally responsible to the sovereign.

For these reasons, there was a reluctance to use the title. Although Walpole is now called the "first" prime minister, the title was not commonly used during his tenure. Walpole himself denied it. In 1741, during the attack that led to Walpole's downfall, Samuel Sandys declared that "According to our Constitution we can have no sole and prime minister". In his defence, Walpole said "I unequivocally deny that I am sole or Prime Minister and that to my influence and direction all the affairs of government must be attributed". George Grenville, prime minister in the 1760s, said it was "an odious title" and never used it. Lord North, the reluctant head of the King's Government during the American War of Independence, "would never suffer himself to be called Prime Minister, because it was an office unknown to the Constitution". (Note: The 18th-century ambivalence causes problems for researchers trying to identify who was a prime minister and who was not. Every list of prime ministers may omit certain politicians. For instance, unsuccessful attempts to form ministries – such as the two-day government formed by the Earl of Bath in 1746 – may be included in a list or omitted, depending on the criteria selected.)

Denials of the premiership's legal existence continued throughout the 19th century. In 1806, for example, one member of the Commons said, "the Constitution abhors the idea of a prime minister". In 1829, Lord Lansdowne said, "nothing could be more mischievous or unconstitutional than to recognise by act of parliament the existence of such an office".

By the turn of the 20th century, the premiership had become, by convention, the most important position in the constitutional hierarchy. Yet there were no legal documents describing its powers or acknowledging its existence. The first official recognition given to the office had only been in the Treaty of Berlin in 1878, when Disraeli signed as "First Lord of the Treasury and Prime Minister of her Britannic Majesty". Not until seven years later, in 1885, did the official records entrench the institution of prime minister, using "Prime Minister" in the list of government ministers printed in Hansard. Incumbents had no statutory authority in their own right. As late as 1904, Arthur Balfour explained the status of his office in a speech at Haddington: "The Prime Minister has no salary as Prime Minister. He has no statutory duties as Prime Minister, his name occurs in no Acts of Parliament, and though holding the most important place in the constitutional hierarchy, he has no place which is recognised by the laws of his country. This is a strange paradox."

In 1905 the position was given some official recognition when the "prime minister" was named in the order of precedence, outranked, among non-royals, only by the archbishops of Canterbury and York, the moderator of the General Assembly of the Church of Scotland and the lord chancellor.

The first Act of Parliament to mention the premiership – albeit in a schedule – was the Chequers Estate Act on 20 December 1917. This law conferred the Chequers Estate owned by Sir Arthur and Lady Lee, as a gift to the Crown for use as a country home for future prime ministers.

Unequivocal legal recognition was given in the Ministers of the Crown Act 1937, which made provision for payment of a salary to the person who is both "the First Lord of the Treasury and Prime Minister". Explicitly recognising two hundred years' of ambivalence, the Act states that it intended "To give statutory recognition to the existence of the position of Prime Minister, and to the historic link between the premiership and the office of First Lord of the Treasury, by providing in respect to that position and office a salary of ..." The Act made a distinction between the "position" (prime minister) and the "office" (First Lord of the Treasury), emphasising the unique political character of the former. Nevertheless, the brass plate on the door of the prime minister's home, 10 Downing Street, still bears the title of "First Lord of the Treasury", as it has since the 18th century as it is officially the home of the First Lord and not the prime minister.

== Union of Great Britain and Ireland, 1801 ==
Following the Irish Rebellion of 1798, the British prime minister, William Pitt the Younger, believed the solution to rising Irish nationalism was a union of Great Britain and the Kingdom of Ireland. Britain then included England and Wales and Scotland, but Ireland had its own parliament and government, which were firmly Anglo-Irish and did not represent the aspirations of most Irishmen. For this and other reasons, Pitt advanced his policy, and after some difficulty in persuading the Irish political class to surrender its control of Ireland under the Constitution of 1782, the new union was created by the Acts of Union 1800. With effect from 1 January 1801, Great Britain and Ireland were united into a single kingdom, the United Kingdom of Great Britain and Ireland, the Parliament of Ireland came to an end, and until 1922 British ministers were responsible for all three kingdoms of the British Isles.

In the 1918 United Kingdom general election, the result in Ireland showed a landslide victory for the Irish republican party Sinn Féin, who vowed in their manifesto to establish an independent Irish Republic. Accordingly, Sinn Féin MPs, though ostensibly elected to sit in the House of Commons, refused to take their seats in Westminster, and instead assembled in 1919 to proclaim Irish independence and form a revolutionary unicameral parliament for the independent Irish Republic, called Dáil Éireann, which in turn established its own government, called the Ministry of Dáil Éireann. At the same time, the Irish Volunteers, who came under the control of the Dáil and became known as the Irish Republican Army, fought against British state forces in the Irish War of Independence. By 1920, the IRA and the Irish Republican Police had a presence in 21 of Ireland's 32 counties, and British authority was only exercised in urban areas. Thus, David Lloyd George, who had been Prime Minister both at the formal proclamation of the Irish Republic in 1919 and at its effective takeover of Ireland in 1920, was the last prime minister to exercise effective authority in both Britain and the whole of Ireland.

The War of Independence ended with the Anglo-Irish Treaty of 6 December 1921, which was to be put into effect within one year. A Provisional Government was set up under the terms of the treaty, but the Irish Republic nominally remained in existence until 6 December 1922, when 26 of the island's 32 counties became a self-governing British dominion under the Irish Free State Constitution Act 1922, called the Irish Free State. Bonar Law, who had been in office as Prime Minister of Great Britain and Ireland for only six weeks, and who had just won the general election of November 1922, thus became the last prime minister whose nominal responsibilities covered both Britain and the whole of Ireland. Most of a parliamentary session beginning on 20 November was devoted to the Act, and Bonar Law pushed through the creation of the Free State in the face of opposition from the "die hards".

== Primus inter pares ==
=== Emergence of Cabinet government ===
Despite the reluctance to legally recognise the premiership, ambivalence toward it waned in the 1780s. During the first 20 years of his reign, George III (1760–1820) tried to be his own "prime minister" by controlling policy from outside the Cabinet, appointing and dismissing ministers, meeting privately with individual ministers, and giving them instructions. These practices caused confusion and dissension in Cabinet meetings; King George's experiment in personal rule was generally a failure. After the failure of Lord North's ministry (1770–1782) in March 1782 due to Britain's defeat in the American Revolutionary War and the ensuing vote of no confidence by Parliament, the Marquess of Rockingham reasserted the prime minister's control over the Cabinet. Rockingham assumed the Premiership "on the distinct understanding that measures were to be changed as well as men; and that the measures for which the new ministry required the royal consent were the measures which they, while in opposition, had advocated." He and his Cabinet were united in their policies and would stand or fall together; they also refused to accept anyone in the Cabinet who did not agree. (Note: This event also marks the beginnings of collective Cabinet responsibility. This principle states that the decisions made by any one Cabinet member become the responsibility of the entire Cabinet.) King George threatened to abdicate but in the end reluctantly agreed out of necessity: he had to have a government.

From this time, there was a growing acceptance of the position of prime minister and the title was more commonly used, if only unofficially. Associated initially with the Whigs, the Tories started to accept it. Lord North, for example, who had said the office was "unknown to the constitution", reversed himself in 1783 when he said, "In this country some one man or some body of men like a Cabinet should govern the whole and direct every measure." In 1803, William Pitt the Younger, also a Tory, suggested to a friend that "this person generally called the first minister" was an absolute necessity for a government to function, and expressed his belief that this person should be the minister in charge of the finances.

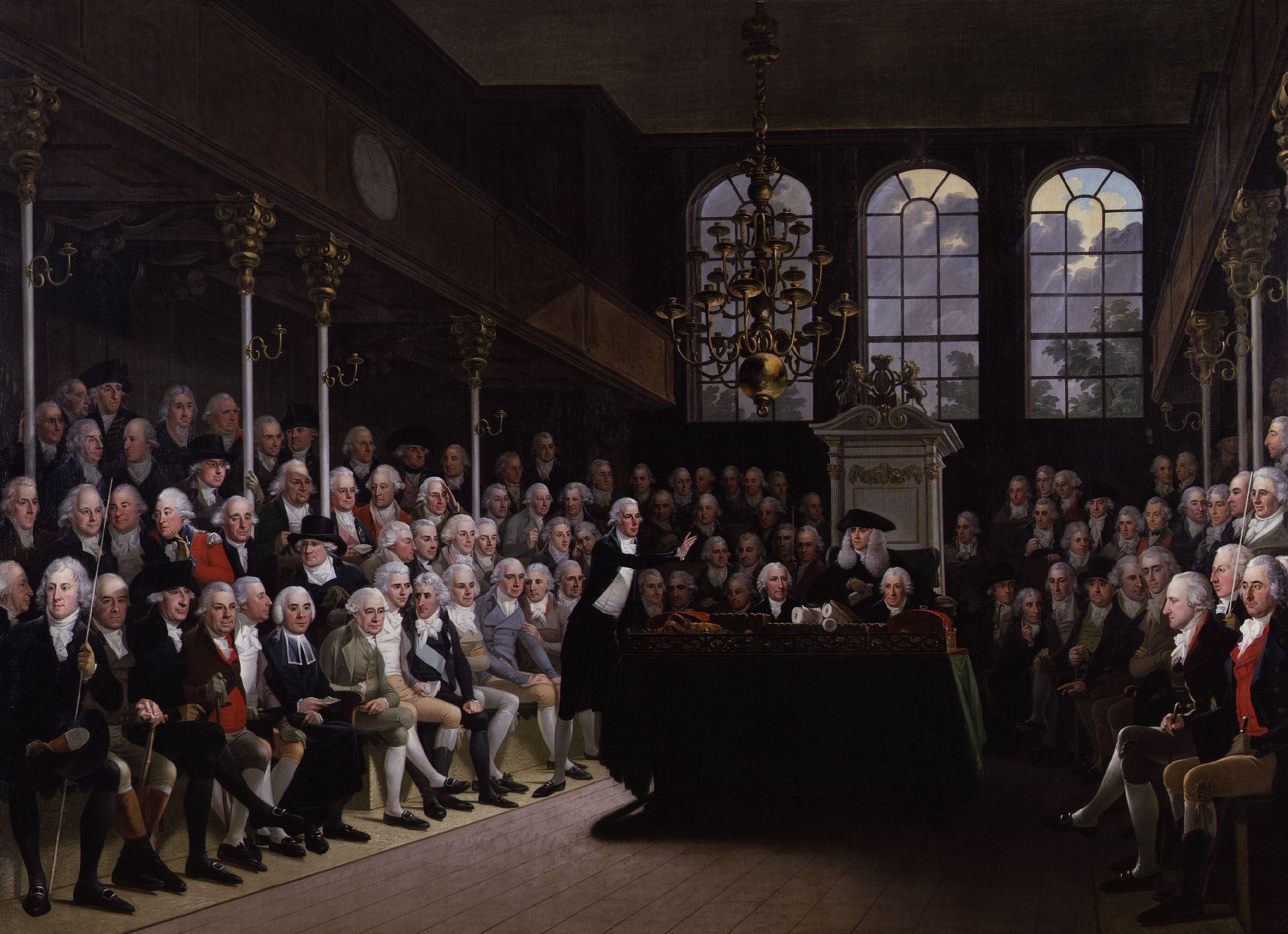
William Pitt the Younger addressing the House of Commons. Pitt's 19 years as prime minister followed by Lord Liverpool's 15, led the Tory Party to accept the office as a convention of the constitution.

The Tories' wholesale conversion started when Pitt was confirmed as prime minister in the election of 1784. For the next 17 years until 1801 (and again from 1804 to 1806), Pitt, the Tory, was prime minister in the same sense that Walpole, the Whig, had been earlier.

Their conversion was reinforced after 1810. In that year, George III, who had suffered periodically from mental instability (possibly due to porphyria), became permanently insane and spent the remaining 10 years of his life unable to discharge his duties. The Prince Regent was prevented from using the full powers of kingship. The regent became George IV in 1820, but during his 10-year reign was indolent and frivolous. Consequently, for 20 years the throne was virtually vacant and Tory Cabinets led by Tory prime ministers filled the void, governing virtually on their own.

The Tories were in power for almost 45 years, except for a Whig ministry from 1806 to 1807. Lord Liverpool was prime minister for almost 15 years; together he and Pitt held the position for almost 33 years. Under their long, consistent leadership, Cabinet government became a convention of the constitution. Although subtle issues remained to be settled, the Cabinet system of government is essentially the same today as it was in 1830.

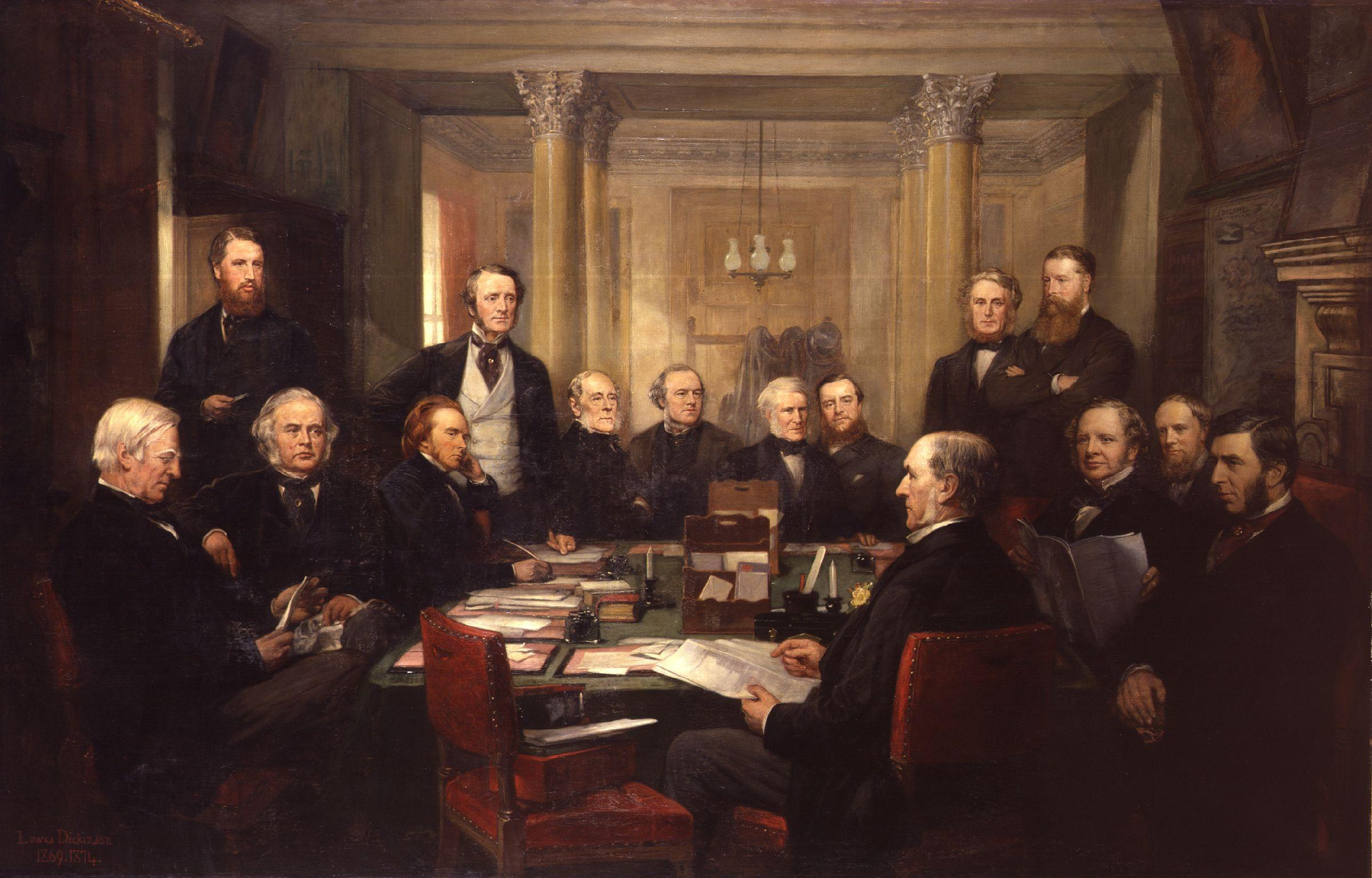
Gladstone's Cabinet of 1868, painted by Lowes Cato Dickinson. Use a cursor to see who is who.

Under this form of government, called the Westminster system, the sovereign is head of state and titular head of His Majesty's Government. The sovereign selects as prime minister the person who is able to command a working majority in the House of Commons, and invites him or her to form a government. As the actual head of government, the prime minister selects the Cabinet, choosing its members from among those in Parliament who agree or generally agree with his or her intended policies. The prime minister then recommends the Cabinet to the sovereign who confirms the selection by formally appointing them to their offices. Led by the prime minister, the Cabinet is collectively responsible for whatever the government does. The Sovereign does not confer with members privately about policy, nor attend Cabinet meetings. With respect to actual governance, the monarch has only three constitutional rights: to be kept informed, to advise, and to warn. In practice this means that the sovereign reviews state papers and meets regularly with the prime minister, usually weekly, when he may advise and warn him or her regarding the proposed decisions and actions of His Government.

=== Loyal Opposition ===
The modern British system includes not only a government formed by the majority party (or coalition of parties) in the House of Commons but also an organised and open opposition formed by those who are not members of the governing party. Called His Majesty's Most Loyal Opposition, they occupy the benches to the speaker's left. Seated in the front, directly across from the ministers on the Treasury Bench, the leaders of the opposition form a "shadow government", complete with a salaried "shadow prime minister", the leader of the Opposition, ready to assume office if the government falls or loses the next election.

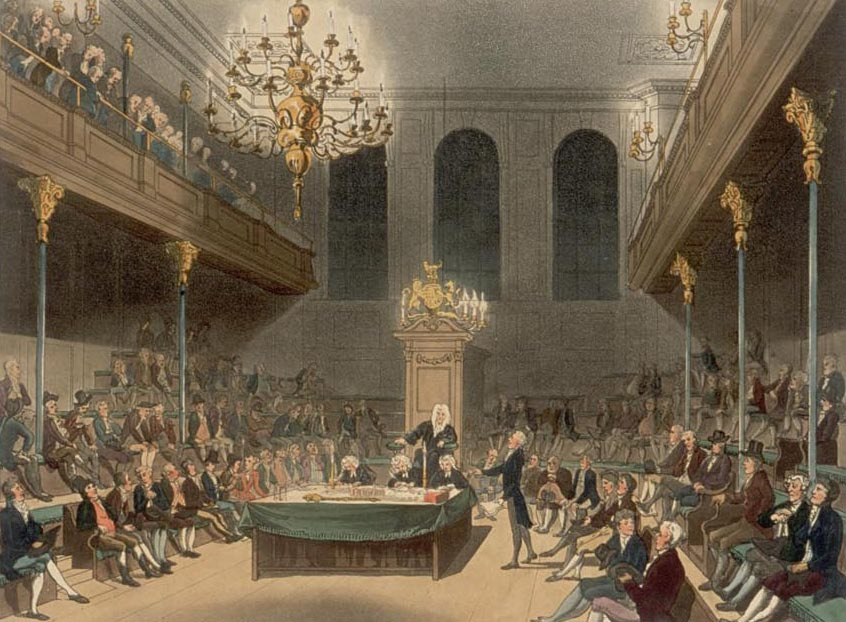
The House of Commons early 19th century. The Loyal Opposition occupy the benches to the Speaker's left. Seated in the front, the leaders of the opposition form a "shadow government", complete with a salaried "shadow prime minister" ready to assume office if the government falls or loses the next election.

Opposing the king's government was considered disloyal, even treasonous, at the end of the 17th century. During the 18th century this idea waned and finally disappeared as the two party system developed. The expression "His Majesty's Opposition" was coined by John Hobhouse, 1st Baron Broughton. In 1826, Broughton, a Whig, announced in the Commons that he opposed the report of a Bill. As a joke, he said, "It was said to be very hard on His Majesty's ministers to raise objections to this proposition. For my part, I think it is much more hard on His Majesty's Opposition to compel them to take this course." The phrase caught on and has been used ever since. Sometimes rendered as the "Loyal Opposition", it acknowledges the legitimate existence of several political parties, and describes an important constitutional concept: opposing the government is not treason; reasonable men can honestly oppose its policies and still be loyal to the Sovereign and the nation.

Informally recognized for over a century as a convention of the constitution, the position of leader of the Opposition was given statutory recognition in 1937 by the Ministers of the Crown Act.

=== Great Reform Act and the premiership ===
British prime ministers have never been elected directly by the public. A prime minister need not be a party leader; David Lloyd George was not a party leader during his tenure during World War I, and neither was Ramsay MacDonald from 1931 to 1935. Prime ministers have taken office because they were members of either the Commons or Lords, and either inherited a majority in the Commons or won more seats than the opposition in a general election.

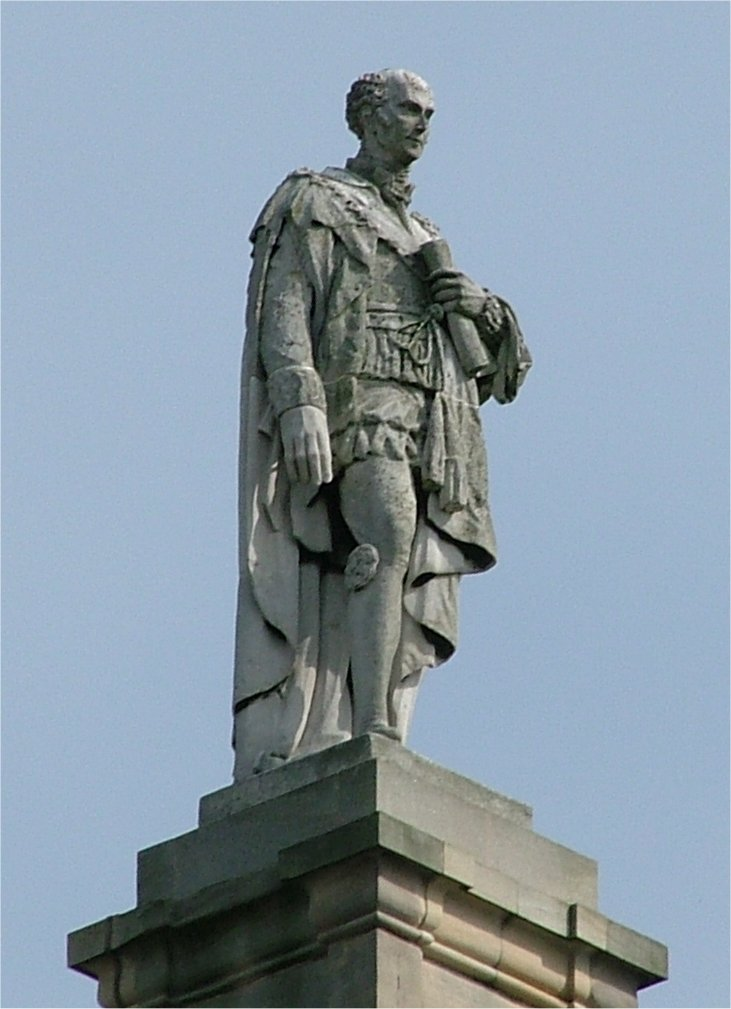
Lord Grey, often called the first modern prime minister

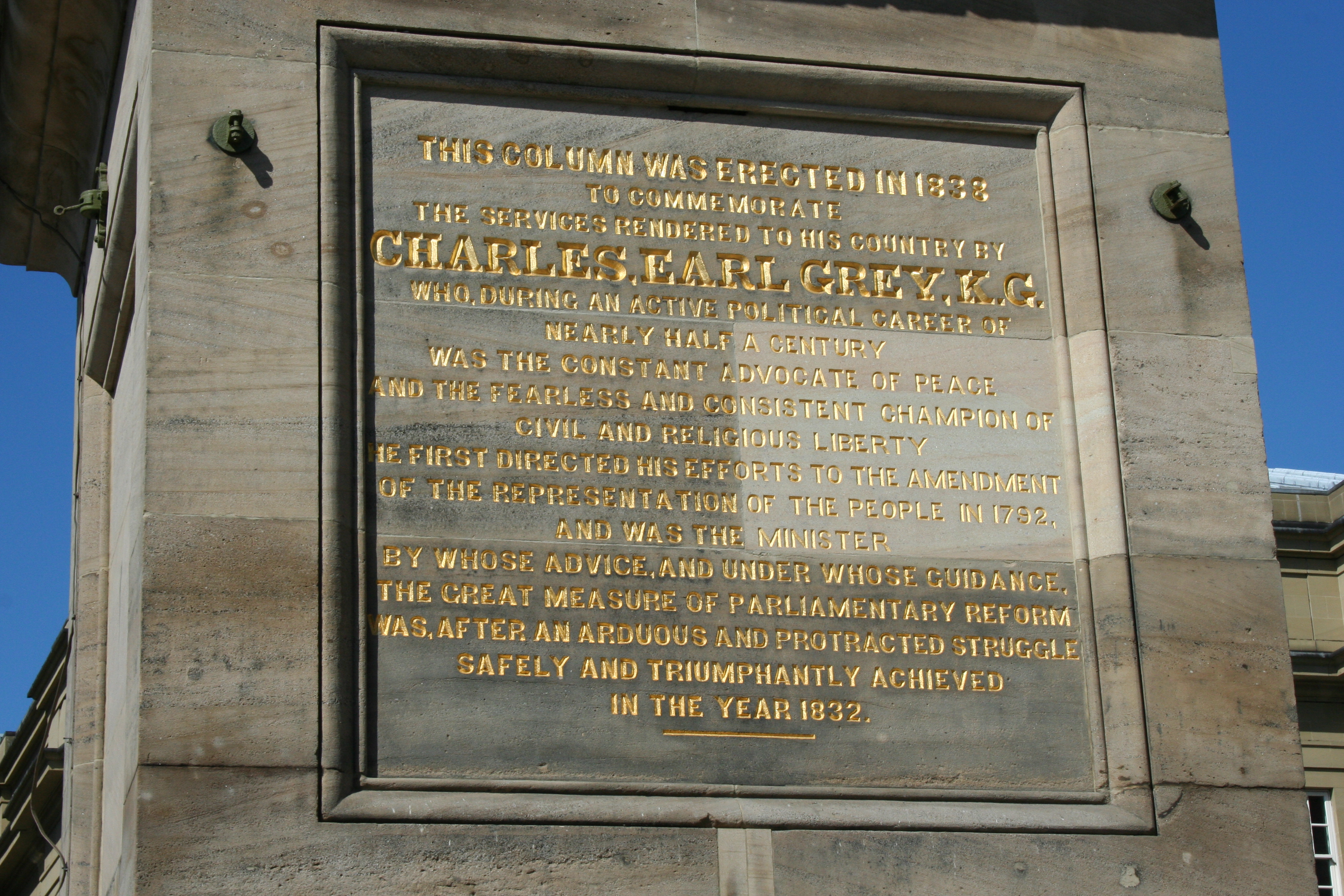
Inscription on Grey's Monument, Newcastle upon Tyne, England

Since 1722, most prime ministers have been members of the Commons; since 1902, all have had a seat there. (Note: Except Lord Home, who resigned his peerage to stand in a by-election soon after becoming prime minister) Like other members, they are elected initially to represent only a constituency. Former prime minister Tony Blair, for example, represented Sedgefield in County Durham from 1983 to 2007. He became prime minister because in 1994 he was elected Labour Party leader and then led the party to victory in the 1997 general election, winning 418 seats compared to 165 for the Conservatives and gaining a majority in the House of Commons.

Neither the sovereign nor the House of Lords had any meaningful influence over who was elected to the Commons in 1997 or in deciding whether or not Blair would become prime minister. Their detachment from the electoral process and the selection of the prime minister has been a convention of the constitution for almost 200 years.

Prior to the 19th century, however, they had significant influence, using to their advantage the fact that most citizens were disenfranchised and seats in the Commons were allocated disproportionately. Through patronage, corruption and bribery, the Crown and Lords "owned" about 30% of the seats (called "pocket" or "rotten boroughs") giving them a significant influence in the Commons and in the selection of the prime minister.

In 1830, Charles Grey, 2nd Earl Grey a life-long Whig, became prime minister and was determined to reform the electoral system. For two years, he and his Cabinet fought to pass what has come to be known as the Great Reform Bill of 1832. The greatness of the Great Reform Bill lay less in substance than in symbolism. As John Bright, a liberal statesman of the next generation, said, "It was not a good Bill, but it was a great Bill when it passed." Substantively, it increased the franchise by 65% to 717,000; with the middle class receiving most of the new votes. The representation of 56 rotten boroughs was eliminated completely, together with half the representation of 30 others; the freed up seats were distributed to boroughs created for previously disenfranchised areas. However, many rotten boroughs remained and it still excluded millions of working-class men and all women.

Symbolically, however, the Reform Act exceeded expectations. It is now ranked with Magna Carta and the Bill of Rights as one of the most important documents of the British constitutional tradition.

First, the Act removed the sovereign from the election process and the choice of prime minister. Slowly evolving for 100 years, this convention was confirmed two years after the passage of the Act. In 1834, King William IV dismissed Melbourne as premier, but was forced to recall him when Robert Peel, the king's choice, could not form a working majority. Since then, no sovereign has tried to impose a prime minister on Parliament.

Second, the Bill reduced the Lords' power by eliminating many of their pocket boroughs and creating new boroughs in which they had no influence. Weakened, they were unable to prevent the passage of more comprehensive electoral reforms in 1867, 1884, 1918 and 1928 when universal equal suffrage was established.

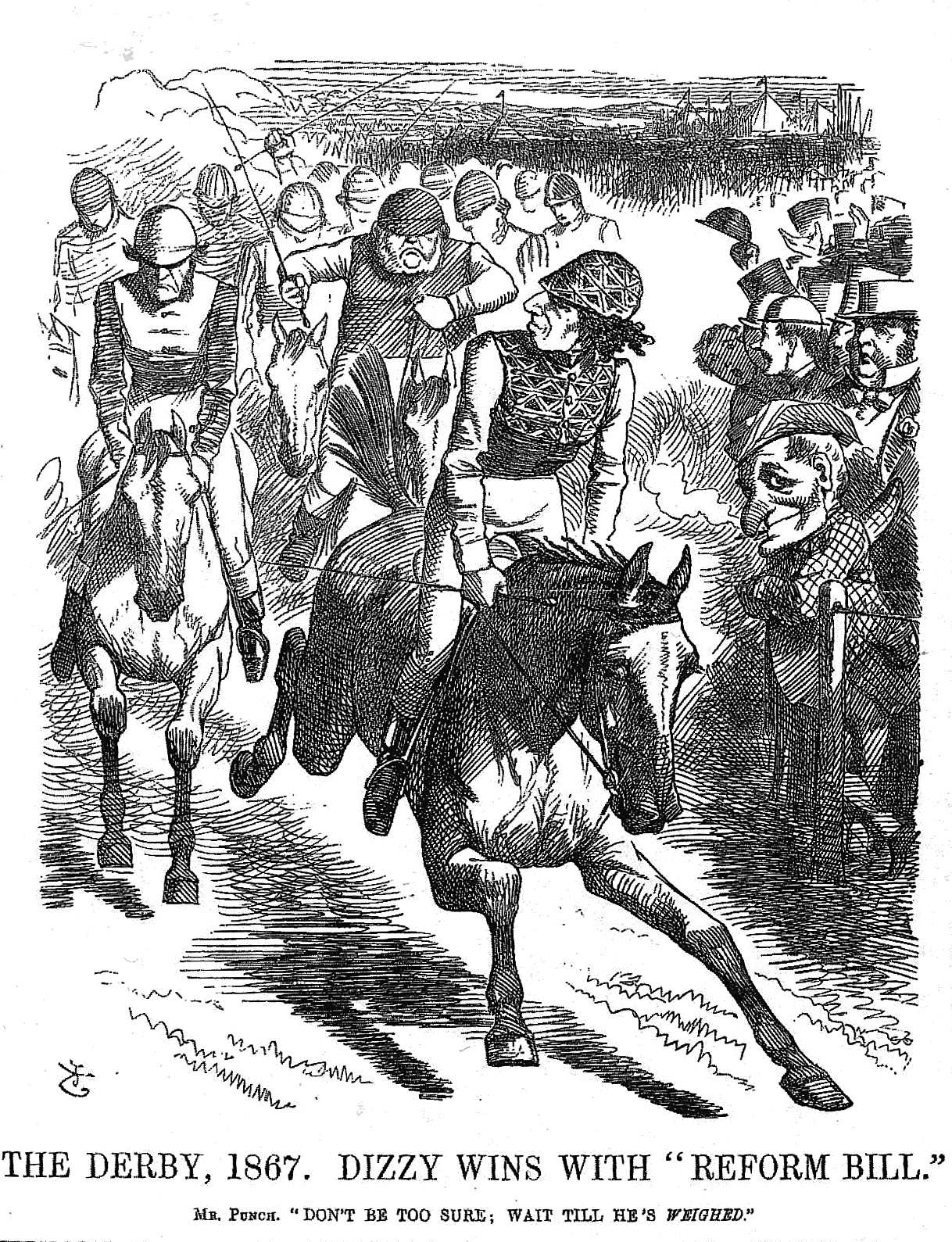
Disraeli and Gladstone Race to Pass the Reform Bill, Punch, 1867 The rivalry between Disraeli and Gladstone helped to identify the position of prime minister with specific personalities. (Disraeli is in the lead looking back over his shoulder at Gladstone.)

Ultimately, this erosion of power led to the Parliament Act 1911, which marginalised the Lords' role in the legislative process and gave further weight to the convention that had developed over the previous century (Note: As early as 1839, the former Prime Minister Duke of Wellington had argued in the House of Lords that "I have long entertained the view that the Prime Minister of this country, under existing circumstances, ought to have a seat in the other House of Parliament, and that he would have great advantage in carrying on the business of the Sovereign by being there." Quoted in Barnett, p. 246) that a prime minister cannot sit in the House of Lords. The last to do so was Robert Gascoyne-Cecil, 3rd Marquess of Salisbury, from 1895 to 1902. (Note: The last prime minister to be a member of the Lords during any part of his tenure was Alec Douglas-Home, 14th Earl of Home in 1963. Lord Home was the last prime minister who was a hereditary peer, but, within days of attaining office, he disclaimed his peerage, abiding by the convention that the prime minister should sit in the House of Commons. A junior member of his Conservative Party who had already been selected as candidate in a by-election in a staunch Conservative seat stood aside, allowing Home to contest and win the by-election, and thus procure a seat in the lower House.) Throughout the 19th century, governments led from the Lords had often suffered difficulties governing alongside ministers who sat in the Commons.

Grey set an example and a precedent for his successors. He was primus inter pares (first among equals), as Bagehot said in 1867 of the prime minister's status. Using his Whig victory as a mandate for reform, Grey was unrelenting in the pursuit of this goal, using every parliamentary device to achieve it. Although respectful toward the king, he made it clear that his constitutional duty was to acquiesce to the will of the people and Parliament.

The Loyal Opposition acquiesced too. Some disgruntled Tories claimed they would repeal the bill once they regained a majority. But in 1834, Robert Peel, the new Conservative leader, put an end to this threat when he stated in his Tamworth Manifesto that the bill was "a final and irrevocable settlement of a great constitutional question which no friend to the peace and welfare of this country would attempt to disturb".

=== Populist prime ministers ===
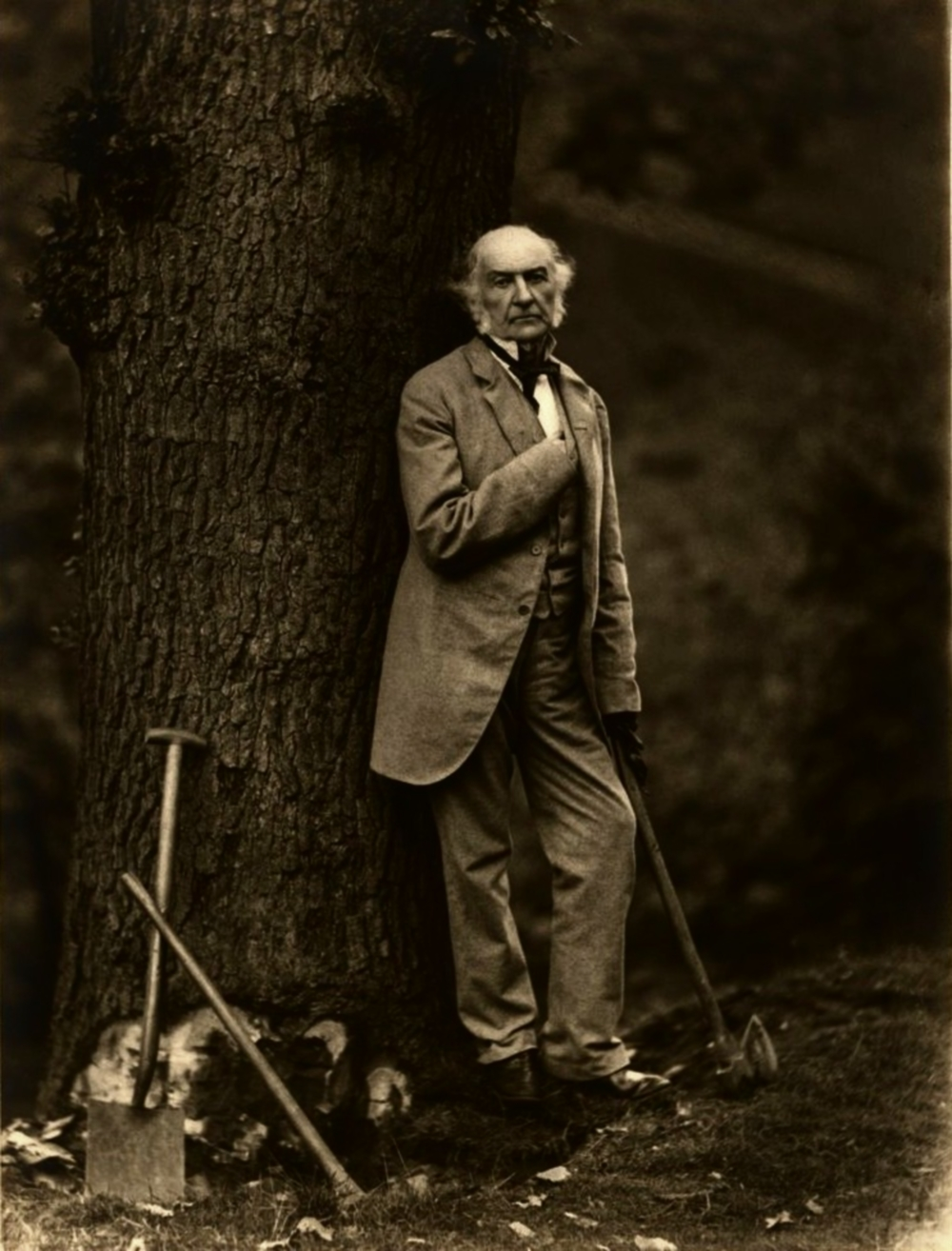
Prime Minister William Ewart Gladstone cultivated the public image as a man of the people by circulating pictures like this of himself cutting down oak trees with an axe. Photo by Elliott & Fry

The premiership was a reclusive office prior to 1832. The incumbent worked with his Cabinet and other government officials; he occasionally met with the sovereign and attended Parliament when it was in session during the spring and summer. He never went out on the stump to campaign, even during elections; he rarely spoke directly to ordinary voters about policies and issues.

After the passage of the Great Reform Bill, the nature of the position changed: prime ministers had to go out among the people. The Bill increased the electorate to 717,000. Subsequent legislation (and population growth) raised it to 2 million in 1867, 5.5 million in 1884 and 21.4 million in 1918. As the franchise increased, power shifted to the people, and prime ministers assumed more responsibilities with respect to party leadership. It naturally fell on them to motivate and organise their followers, explain party policies, and deliver its "message". Successful leaders had to have a new set of skills: to give a good speech, present a favourable image, and interact with a crowd. They became the "voice", the "face" and the "image" of the party and ministry.

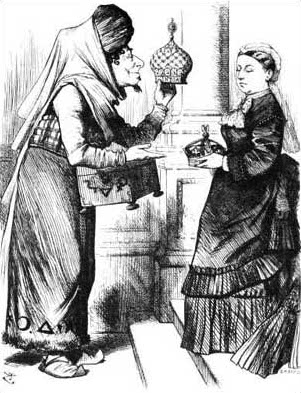
Prime Minister Benjamin Disraeli cultivated a public image as an imperialist with grand gestures such as conferring on Victoria the title "Empress of India".

Robert Peel, often called the "model prime minister", was the first to recognise this new role. After the successful Conservative campaign of 1841, J. W. Croker said in a letter to Peel, "The elections are wonderful, and the curiosity is that all turns on the name of Sir Robert Peel. It's the first time that I remember in our history that the people have chosen the first Minister for the Sovereign. Mr. Pitt's case in '84 is the nearest analogy; but then the people only confirmed the Sovereign's choice; here every Conservative candidate professed himself in plain words to be Sir Robert Peel's man, and on that ground was elected."

Benjamin Disraeli and William Ewart Gladstone developed this new role further by projecting "images" of themselves to the public. Known by their nicknames "Dizzy" and the "Grand Old Man", their colourful, sometimes bitter, personal and political rivalry over the issues of their time – Imperialism vs. Anti-Imperialism, expansion of the franchise, labour reform, and Irish Home Rule – spanned almost twenty years until Disraeli's death in 1881. (Note: Even after death their rivalry continued. When Disraeli died in 1881, Gladstone proposed a state funeral, but Disraeli's will specified that he have a private funeral and be buried next to his wife. Gladstone replied, "As [Disraeli] lived, so he died—all display, without reality or genuineness." Disraeli, for his part, once said that GOM (the acronym for "Grand Old Man") really stood for "God's Only Mistake".) Documented by the penny press, photographs and political cartoons, their rivalry linked specific personalities with the premiership in the public mind and further enhanced its status.

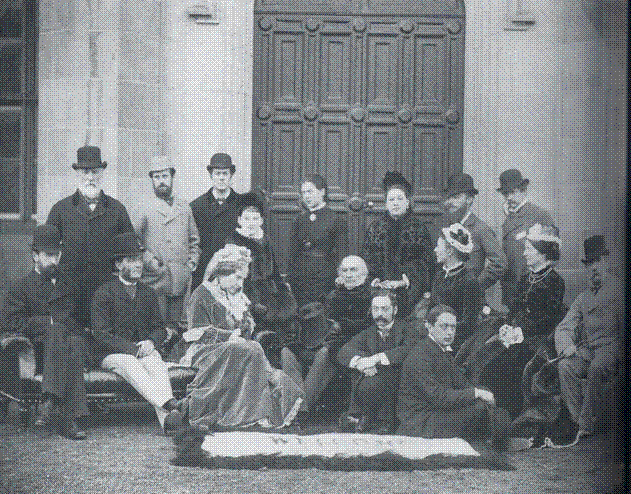
Gladstone During the Midlothian Campaign 1879 Speaking directly to the people for the first time, Gladstone's Midlothian campaign symbolises a major change in the role of the prime minister. (Gladstone is seated in the centre; Rosebery, a future prime minister, is sitting on the carpet in front.)

Each created a different public image of himself and his party. Disraeli, who expanded the Empire to protect British interests abroad, cultivated the image of himself (and the Conservative Party) as "Imperialist", making grand gestures such as conferring the title "Empress of India" on Queen Victoria in 1876. Gladstone, who saw little value in the Empire, proposed an anti-Imperialist policy (later called "Little England"), and cultivated the image of himself (and the Liberal Party) as "man of the people" by circulating pictures of himself cutting down great oak trees with an axe as a hobby.

Gladstone went beyond image by appealing directly to the people. In his Midlothian campaign – so called because he stood as a candidate for that county – Gladstone spoke in fields, halls and railway stations to hundreds, sometimes thousands, of students, farmers, labourers and middle class workers. Although not the first leader to speak directly to voters – both he and Disraeli had spoken directly to party loyalists before on special occasions – he was the first to canvass an entire constituency, delivering his message to anyone who would listen, encouraging his supporters and trying to convert his opponents. Publicised nationwide, Gladstone's message became that of the party. Noting its significance, Lord Shaftesbury said, "It is a new thing and a very serious thing to see the Prime Minister on the stump."

Campaigning directly to the people became commonplace. Several 20th-century prime ministers, such as David Lloyd George and Winston Churchill, were famous for their oratorical skills. After the introduction of radio, motion pictures, television, and the internet, many used these technologies to project their public image and address the nation. Stanley Baldwin, a master of the radio broadcast in the 1920s and 1930s, reached a national audience in his talks filled with homely advice and simple expressions of national pride. Churchill also used the radio to great effect, inspiring, reassuring and informing the people with his speeches during the Second World War. Two recent prime ministers, Margaret Thatcher and Tony Blair (who both spent a decade or more as prime minister), achieved celebrity status like rock stars, but have been criticised for their more 'presidential' style of leadership. According to Anthony King, "The props in Blair's theatre of celebrity included ... his guitar, his casual clothes ... footballs bounced skilfully off the top of his head ... carefully choreographed speeches and performances at Labour Party conferences."

== Parliament Act and the premiership ==
In addition to being the leader of a political party and the head of His Majesty's Government, the modern prime minister directs the law-making process, enacting into law his or her party's programme. For example, Tony Blair, whose Labour party was elected in 1997 partly on a promise to enact a British Bill of Rights and to create devolved governments for Scotland and Wales, subsequently stewarded through Parliament the Human Rights Act (1998), the Scotland Act (1998) and the Government of Wales Act (1998).

From its appearance in the fourteenth century Parliament has been a bicameral legislature consisting of the Commons and the Lords. Members of the Commons are elected; those in the Lords are not. Most Lords are "temporal", with titles such as duke, marquess, earl, viscount and baron. The remainder are Lords Spiritual (prelates of the Anglican Church).

For most of the history of the Upper House, Lords Temporal were landowners who held their estates, titles, and seats as a hereditary right passed down from one generation to the next – in some cases for centuries. In 1910, for example, there were nineteen whose title was created before 1500. (Note: Following a series of reforms in the twentieth century the Lords now consists almost entirely of appointed members who hold their title only for their own lifetime. As of 11 June 2012 the Lords had 763 members (excluding 49 who were on leave of absence or otherwise disqualified from sitting), compared to 646 in the Commons.)

Until 1911, prime ministers had to guide legislation through the Commons and the Lords and obtain majority approval in both houses for it to become law. This was not always easy, because political differences often separated the chambers. Representing the landed aristocracy, lords temporal were generally Tory (later Conservative) who wanted to maintain the status quo and resisted progressive measures such as extending the franchise. The party affiliation of members of the Commons was less predictable. During the 18th century its makeup varied because the Lords had considerable control over elections: sometimes Whigs dominated it, sometimes Tories. After the passage of the Great Reform Bill in 1832, the Commons gradually became more progressive, a tendency that increased with each subsequent expansion of the franchise.

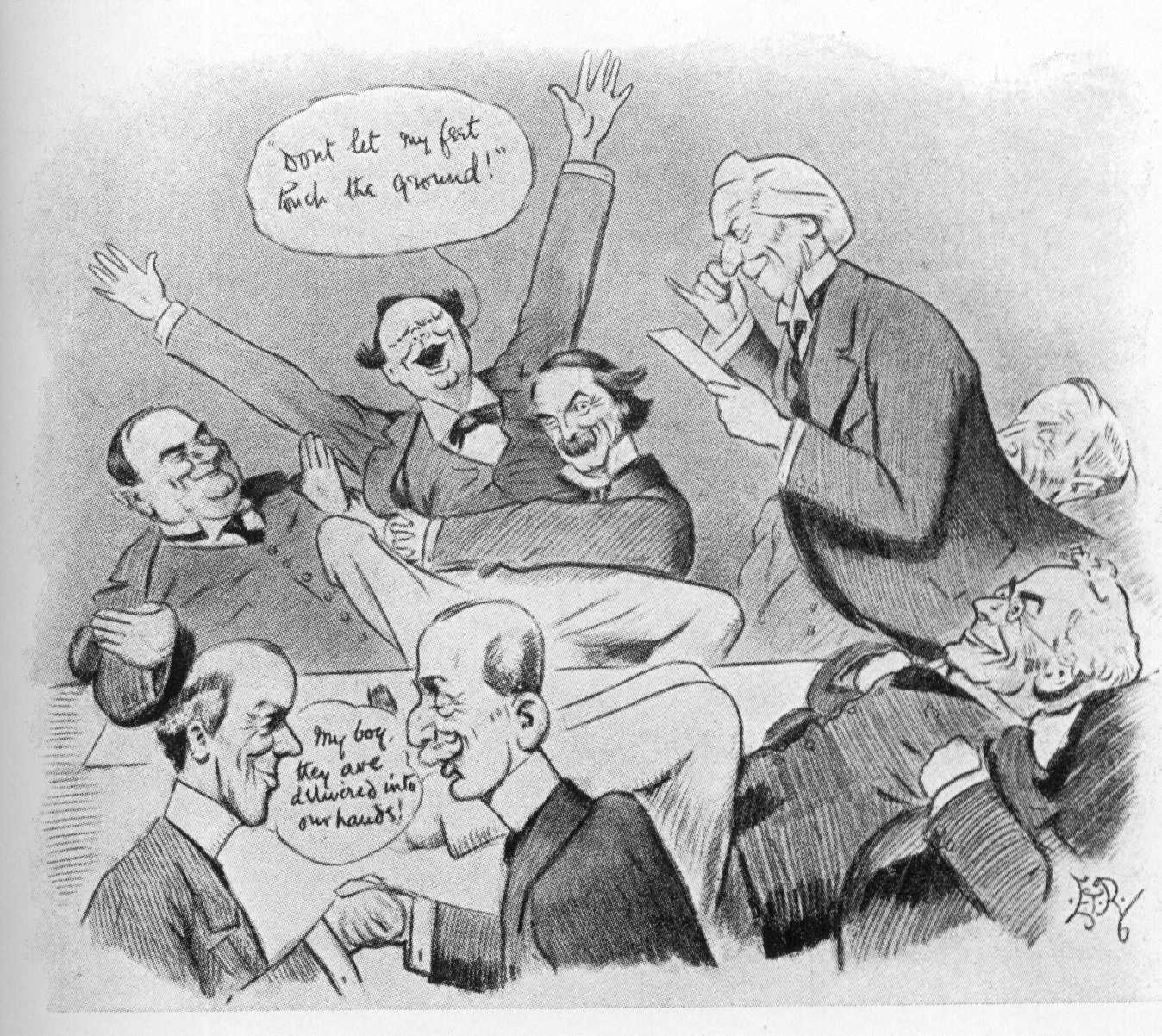
Asquith's Cabinet Reacts to the Lords' Rejection of the "People's Budget"—a satirical cartoon, 1909. Prime Minister Asquith's government welcomed the Lords' veto of the "People's Budget"; it moved the country toward a constitutional crisis over the Lords' legislative powers. (Asquith makes the announcement while David Lloyd George holds down a jubilant Winston Churchill.)

In 1906, the Liberal Party, led by Sir Henry Campbell-Bannerman, won an overwhelming victory on a platform that promised social reforms for the working class. With 379 seats compared to the Conservatives' 132, the Liberals could confidently expect to pass their legislative programme through the Commons. At the same time, however, the Conservative Party had a huge majority in the Lords; it could easily veto any legislation passed by the Commons that was against their interests.

For five years, the Commons and the Lords fought over one bill after another. The Liberals pushed through parts of their programme, but the Conservatives vetoed or modified others. When the Lords vetoed the "People's Budget" in 1909, the controversy moved almost inevitably toward a constitutional crisis.

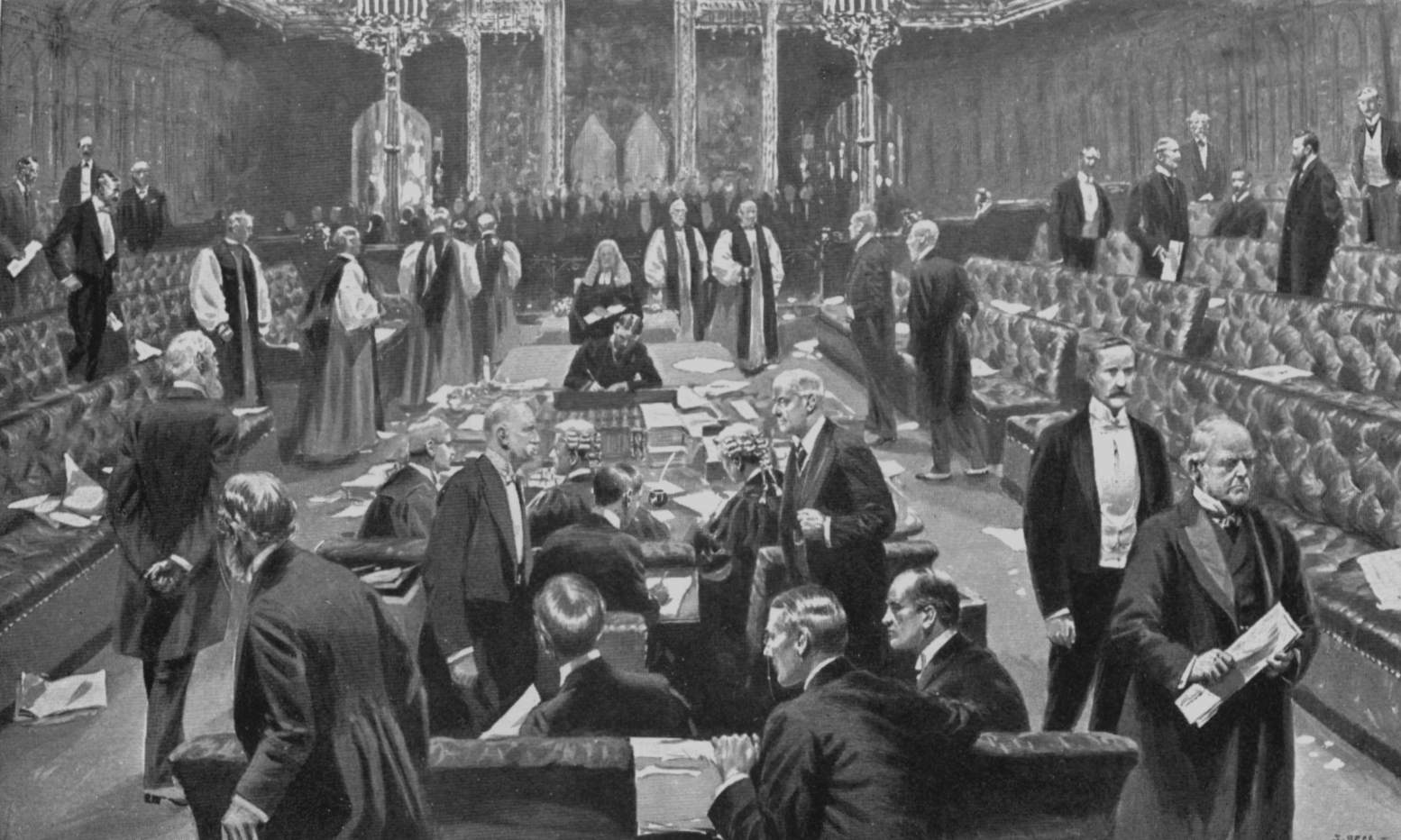
An important vote: the House of Lords voting for the Parliament Act 1911. From the Drawing by S. Begg The Parliament Act 1911 eliminated the Lords' veto power over legislation approved by the House of Commons. Indirectly, it also further enhanced the dominance of the prime minister in the constitutional hierarchy.

In 1910, Prime Minister H. H. Asquith (Note: Campbell-Bannerman retired and died in 1908.) introduced a bill "for regulating the relations between the Houses of Parliament" which would eliminate the Lords' veto power over legislation. Passed by the Commons, the Lords rejected it. In a general election fought on this issue, the Liberals were weakened but still had a comfortable majority. At Asquith's request, King George V then threatened to create a sufficient number of new Liberal peers to ensure the bill's passage. Rather than accept a permanent Liberal majority, the Conservative lords yielded, and the bill became law.

The Parliament Act 1911 established the supremacy of the Commons. It provided that the Lords could not delay for more than one month any bill certified by the speaker of the Commons as a money bill. Furthermore, the Act provided that any bill rejected by the Lords would nevertheless become law if passed by the Commons in three successive sessions provided that two years had elapsed since its original passage. The Lords could still delay or suspend the enactment of legislation but could no longer veto it. The Lords' "suspending" power was reduced to one year by the Parliament Act 1949.

Indirectly, the Act enhanced the already dominant position of prime minister in the constitutional hierarchy. Although the Lords are still involved in the legislative process and the prime minister must still guide legislation through both Houses, the Lords no longer have the power to veto or even delay enactment of legislation passed by the Commons. Prime ministers are assured of passing their legislative agenda, assuming the prime minister maintains control of the Cabinet, maintains party discipline, and commands a majority in the Commons.

== Works cited ==
- Barnett, Hilaire (2009). Constitutional & Administrative Law (7th ed.). Abingdon, Oxfordshire: Routledge-Cavendish.
- Dodd, A. H. (1956). The Growth of Responsible Government from James the First to Victoria. London: Routledge and Kegan Paul.
- Foord, Archibald S. (1964). His Majesty's Opposition. Clarendon Press, Oxford. ISBN 978-0-313-21974-0.
- Jennings, Ivor (1959). "The Formation of a Government". Cabinet Government (3rd ed.). Cambridge University Press.
- King, Anthony (2007). The British Constitution. Oxford University Press, Oxford. ISBN 978-0-9691436-3-5.
- Knappen, M. M. (1942). Constitutional and Legal History of England. Harcourt, Brace & Company. ISBN 978-0-8377-2335-8.
- Low, S. (1904). The Governance of England. T. Fisher Unwin, London. ISBN 978-0-521-38155-0.
- Marriott, J. A. R. (1925). English Political Institutions. Oxford University Press, Oxford.
- Pike, E. Royston (1968). Britain's Prime Ministers: From Walpole to Wilson. Odhams Books. ISBN 978-0-600-72032-4.
- Roseveare, Henry (1973). Treasury, 1660–1870: The Foundations of Control. Allen and Unwin. ISBN 978-0-04-942115-8.
- Smith, Goldwin (1990). A Constitutional and Legal History of England. Dorset Press. ISBN 978-0-88029-474-4.
- Tuchman, Barbara W. (1966). The Proud Tower, A Portrait of the World before the War, 1890–1914. The Macmillan Company. ISBN 978-0-345-40501-2.
- — (1984). The March of Folly, From Troy to Vietnam. Random House. ISBN 978-0-345-30823-8.
- Walpole, S. (2009). Essays Political and Biographical. BiblioBazaar, llc. ISBN 978-1-113-70982-0.
