= LGBTQ nobility and royalty =

Throughout history, members of royal and noble houses have engaged in same-sex relationships. However, even in jurisdictions where homosexuality was not prohibited or proscribed by law or religious edicts, titles of aristocracy were almost always directly transferred through married spouses of the opposite sex and their offspring (except when certain titles could be inherited by relatives upon a childless death). Nevertheless, same-sex relationships occurred before, during, and outside such arrangements, as romance and marriage have widely historically been seen as two very different things.

The terms 'homosexuality' and 'heterosexuality' did not exist until the late 19th century. For much of human history, most societies around the world did not view sexuality in modern binary terms. Indeed, many of these cultures had variously tolerated, acknowledged, accepted, or celebrated diverse sexualities and genders at different moments in their history.

The scope of this list is limited to sovereign rulers and aristocracy who have titles that were recognized during their lives. This list excludes baronets from the United Kingdom, the landed gentry, imposters, and pretenders, and the equivalent in other countries.

== History ==
=== Ancient and medieval times ===
==== Imperial China ====
Several Chinese emperors had openly homosexual relationships. A famous example is that of Emperor Ai of Han and his lover, Dong Xian, whom Ai promoted quickly through government ranks and ennobled as a marquess (this despite the fact that both men were legally married to women).

Throughout written Chinese history, the role of women is given little positive emphasis, with relationships between women being especially rare. One mention by Ying Shao, who lived about 140 to 206, does relate palace women attaching themselves as husband and wife, a relationship called dui shi. He noted, "They are intensely jealous of each other."

==== Ancient Rome ====
A number of Roman rulers had homosexual relationships, including the Emperor Hadrian and his lover Antinous, and the Emperor Elagabalus and his lovers Aurelius Zoticus and Hierocles.

=== Europe ===
In many European countries, same-sex relations have historically been stigmatized, illegal, or considered sinful by Christians. Sometimes charges of homosexual relations were propagated by enemies, often rumors of such activities were denied, and sometimes same-sex lovers were acknowledged openly.

In the United Kingdom, despite the legalization of civil partnerships for same-sex couples in 2004 and marriage for same-sex couples in 2013, spouses of ennobled civil partners have not been allowed the extension of title and privilege from their spouses' ennoblements as those accorded to married opposite-sex spouses of ennobled persons. In July 2012, Conservative MP Oliver Colvile announced a private member's bill, titled "Honours (Equality of Titles for Partners) Bill 2012-13", to amend the honours system to both allow husbands of those made dames and for civil partners of recipients to receive honours by their relationship statuses. Another bill, the Equality (Titles) Bill, which would allow for both female first-born descendants to inherit hereditary titles as well as for "husbands and civil partners" of honours recipients "to use equivalent honorary titles to those available to wives", was introduced by Lord Lucas in the House of Lords on 13 May 2013, but did not progress past Committee stage.

On 7 March 2008 Luisa Isabel Álvarez de Toledo, 21st Duchess of Medina Sidonia, a Spanish aristocrat, married Liliana Maria Dahlmann in a civil ceremony on her deathbed. Today, the Dowager Duchess is Liliana Maria.

In 2016, Lord Ivar Mountbatten, a cousin of the then-reigning Queen Elizabeth II, became the first member of the British aristocracy to come out as bisexual. He married his partner in 2018.

In June 2025, Maud Angelica Behn, the eldest granddaughter of King Harald V of Norway, came out as bisexual through an Instagram post with images from Oslo Pride celebrations.

=== South and Southeast Asia ===
A significant event in LGBT aristocracy occurred in 2006, when Manvendra Singh Gohil, a prince of the former princely state of Rajpipla in Gujarat, India, came out as gay to Indian media; the event caused controversy both in India and abroad, and his family unsuccessfully attempted to disinherit him.

Prince Azim of Brunei was outed in 2019, the year before his death.

== List ==
=== Austria ===
- Maria Christina, Duchess of Teschen (1742–1798)
- Archduke Ludwig Viktor of Austria (1842-1919)
- Archduke Wilhelm of Austria (1895–1948)

=== Aztec Empire ===
- Xicomecoatl

=== Britain & Ireland ===
- James VI and I (1566–1625) (lover of Richard Preston, 1st Earl of Desmond and Robert Carr, 1st Earl of Somerset)
- George Villiers, 1st Duke of Buckingham (1592-1628)
- Sarah Churchill, Duchess of Marlborough (1660-1744)
- Anne, Queen of Great Britain (1665-1714) (alleged lover of Sarah Churchill, Duchess of Marlborough and Abigail Masham, Baroness Masham)
- Abigail Masham, Baroness Masham (1670–1734)
- Lady Catherine Jones (1672–1740) (lover of Mary Astell and Mary Kendall)
- Ernest Augustus, Duke of York and Albany (1674–1728)
- Lady Frances Brudenell (1677-1736)
- John Hervey, 2nd Baron Hervey (1696–1743)
- John Tylney, 2nd Earl Tylney (1712–1784)
- George Germain, 1st Viscount Sackville (1716–1785)
- Caroline Stanhope, Countess of Harrington (1722-1784)
- Sir Benjamin Thompson, Count Rumford (1753–1814)
- Hon. Edward Onslow (1758-1829)
- William Courtenay, 9th Earl of Devon (1768-1835)
- Lord Byron (1788-1824) (controversial)
- Robert King, 4th Earl of Kingston (1796-1867)
- Henry Lygon, 5th Earl Beauchamp (1829–1866)
- Lord Arthur Clinton (1840–1870)
- Cyril Flower, 1st Baron Battersea (1843–1907)
- Lord Ronald Gower (1845–1916)
- John Campbell, 9th Duke of Argyll (1845–1914)
- Archibald Primrose, 5th Earl of Rosebery (1847–1929) (controversial)
- Lord Henry Arthur George Somerset (1851-1926)
- Reginald Brett, 2nd Viscount Esher (1852-1930)
- Alexander Hood, 5th Duke of Bronte (1854-1937)
- Lewis Harcourt, 1st Viscount Harcourt (1863-1922)
- Sir Roger Casement (1864–1916)
- Francis Douglas, Viscount Drumlanrig (1867–1894) (uncertain)
- Lord Alfred "Bosie" Douglas (1870-1945)
- George Hamilton-Gordon, 2nd Baron Stanmore (1871-1957)
- George Seymour, 7th Marquess of Hertford (1871-1940)
- William Lygon, 7th Earl Beauchamp (1872-1938)
- Sir Edmund Backhouse, 2nd Baronet (1873-1944)
- Lady Helena Gleichen (1873-1947)
- Henry Paget, 5th Marquess of Anglesey (1875–1905)
- Lord Berners (1883–1950)
- Hon. Sir Harold Nicolson (1886–1968)
- Alexander Mountbatten, 1st Marquess of Carisbrooke (1886–1950)
- Ian Maitland, 15th Earl of Lauderdale (1891-1953)
- Evan Morgan, 2nd Viscount Tredegar (1893-1949)
- Harry Crookshank, 1st Viscount Crookshank (1893–1961)
- Nadejda Mountbatten, Marchioness of Milford Haven (1896-1963) (lover of Gloria Morgan Vanderbilt)
- Jeffery Amherst, 5th Earl Amherst (1896-1993) (lover and friend of Noël Coward)
- Oliver Baldwin, 2nd Earl Baldwin of Bewdley (1899-1958)
- Robert Boothby, Baron Boothby (1900-1986) (controversial)
- Basil Mackenzie, 2nd Baron Amulree (1900–1983) (presumed lover of Douglas Cooper)
- Prince George, Duke of Kent (1902–1942)
- Gavin Henderson, 2nd Baron Faringdon (1902–1977)
- James Thomas, 1st Viscount Cilcennin (1903–1960) (presumed)
- Patrick Balfour, 3rd Baron Kinross (1904–1976)
- Alan Lennox-Boyd, 1st Viscount Boyd of Merton (1904–1983)
- Graham Eyres-Monsell, 2nd Viscount Monsell (1905-1994)
- Hon. Pamela Mitford (1907–1994)
- Hon. Tom Mitford (1909-1945) (lover of James Lees-Milne)
- Hon. Desmond Parsons (1910–1937) (lover of Sir Harold Acton and James Lees-Milne)
- Edward Douglas-Scott-Montagu, 3rd Baron Montagu of Beaulieu (1926-2015)
- Nicholas Eden, 2nd Earl of Avon (1930–1985)
- Antony Armstrong-Jones, Earl of Snowdon (1930–2017)
- Sheridan Hamilton-Temple-Blackwood, 5th Marquess of Dufferin and Ava (1938–1988)
- Hon. Sir Peter Morrison (1944–1995) (uncertain, rumors never confirmed)
- John Hervey, 7th Marquess of Bristol (1954–1999)
- Lord Ivar Mountbatten (born 1963–)

=== Brunei ===
- Azim of Brunei (1982–2020)

=== Bulgaria ===
- Ferdinand I of Bulgaria (1861–1948)

=== China ===
- Mizi Xia (uncertain existence)
- Duke Ling of Wey (534 BCE - 492 BCE)
- Out of the twelve recognized emperors in the Western Han dynasty (the first half of the Han dynasty), ten were recorded as having had at least one male partner. These include:
  - Emperor Gaozu of Han (256-195 BCE, lover of Ji Ru)
  - Emperor Hui of Han (210-188 BCE, lover of Hong Ru)
  - Emperor Wen of Han (203/202-157 BCE, lover of Deng Tong)
  - Emperor Jing of Han (188–141 BCE, lover of Zhou Wenren)
  - Emperor Wu of Han (156–87 BCE, lover of Han Yuan, likely also Wei Qing and Huo Qubin)
  - Emperor Yuan of Han (75–33 BCE, lover of Hong Gong and Shi Xian)
  - Emperor Cheng of Han (51–7 BCE, lover of Zhang Fang)
  - Emperor Ai of Han (27-1 BCE, lover of Dong Xian)
- Huo Guang
- Emperor Wen of Chen (522-566, lover of Han Zigao)
- Zhengde Emperor (1491-1521)
- Tianqi Emperor (1605–1627)
- Puyi (1906–1967)
- Yoshiko Kawashima (1907–1948)

=== Cambodia ===
- King Sihamoni of Cambodia (1953–Present)

=== Denmark ===
- Valdemar of Denmark (1858-1939)

=== Egypt ===
- Khnumhotep and Niankhkhnum
- King Neferkare and General Sasenet (Pepi II Neferkare)

=== France ===
- John II of France (1319–1364) (presumed lover of Charles de la Cerda)
- Henry III of France (1551–1589)
- Jacques Vallée, Sieur Des Barreaux (1599-1673) (lover of Théophile de Viau)
- Louis XIII (1601-1643)
- Armand de Gramont, Comte de Guiche (1637-1673)
- Philippe I, Duke of Orléans (1640–1701)
- Philippe Jules Mancini, Duke of Nevers (1641–1707)
- Philippe, Chevalier de Lorraine (1643–1702)
- Philippe Jules Mancini (1641–1707)
- François-Timoléon de Choisy (1644–1724)
- Nicolas Chalon du Blé (1652–1730)
- Louis Joseph, Duke of Vendôme (1654–1712)
- François Louis, Prince of Conti (1664-1709)
- Louis, Count of Vermandois (1667-1683)
- Julie d'Aubigny (1673–1707)
- Honoré Armand de Villars (1702–1770)
- Henri-Lambert de Thibouville (1710–1784)
- Chevalier d'Éon (1728–1810)
- Charles, Marquis de Villette (1736–1793)
- Jean-Jacques-Régis de Cambacérès, Duke of Parma (1753–1824)
- Paul Barras (1755–1827)
- Marquis de Custine (1790–1857)
- Edmond de Polignac (1834–1901)
- Jacques Godart, 6th Marquis de Belbeuf (1850–1906)
- Robert de Montesquiou (1855–1921)
- Mathilde de Morny (1863–1944)
- Hélène van Zuylen, Baroness of Van Zuylen van Nijevelt van de Haar (née de Rothschild, 1863–1947)
- Winnaretta Singer (1865–1943) (lover of Olga de Meyer and Renata Borgatti)
- Maurice Talvande, Count de Mauny Talvande (1866-1941)
- Élisabeth de Gramont (1875-1954)
- Jacques d'Adelswärd-Fersen (1880–1923)

=== Germany ===
- Richard Puller von Hohenburg (1454–1482)
- Rudolf II, Holy Roman Emperor (1552-1612) (presumed)
- Augustus William, Duke of Brunswick-Wolfenbüttel (1662-1731)
- Frederick the Great (1712–1786) (lover of Michael Gabriel Fredersdorf and Peter Karl Christoph von Keith)
- Prince Henry of Prussia (1726–1802)
- Duke Gustav Wilhelm of Mecklenburg-Schwerin (1781–1851)
- Prince Paul of Thurn and Taxis (1843–1879)
- Charles I of Württemberg (1823–1891)
- Ludwig II of Bavaria (1845–1886)
- Philipp, Prince of Eulenburg (1847-1921)
- Frederick Francis III, Grand Duke of Mecklenburg-Schwerin (1851-1897)
- Frederick of Hohenau (1857-1914)
- Prince Aribert of Anhalt (1866–1933) (uncertain)
- Prince Maximilian of Baden (1867-1929)
- Ernest Louis, Grand Duke of Hesse (1868-1937)
- Harry Graf Kessler (1868–1937)
- Prince Friedrich Heinrich Albrecht of Prussia (1874-1940)
- Philipp, Landgrave of Hesse (1896-1980) (uncertain)
- Johannes, 11th Prince of Thurn and Taxis (1926-1990)
- Franz, Duke of Bavaria (1933–)
- Arndt von Bohlen und Halbach (1938–1986)
- Prince Egon von Fürstenberg (1946–2004)

=== Greece ===
==== Ancient ====
- Philolaus of Corinth (lover of Diocles of Corinth)
- Pisistratus (c. 600–527 BCE) (lover of Charmus)
- Hipparchus (d. c. 514 BCE) (in love with Harmodius)
- Lysander (c. 454–395 BCE)
- Agesilaus II (445/4-360/59 BCE) (lover of Lysander)
- Callias III (lover of Autolycus of Athens)
- Meno (c. 423-c. 400 BCE) (lover of Aristippus of Larissa and Ariaeus)
- Archidamus III (d. 338 BCE) (lover of Cleonymus)
- Philip II (382–336 BCE) (lover of Pausanias of Orestis and possible lover of Pammenes of Thebes)
- Alexander the Great (356–323 BCE) (lover of Hephaestion)

==== Byzantine ====
- Michael III (840–867)
- Basil I (811–886)

==== Modern ====
- Prince George of Greece and Denmark (1869-1957)

=== Hungary ===
- Sigismund Báthory (1573-1613)
- Franz Nopcsa von Felső-Szilvás (1877-1933) (lover of Bajazid Doda)

=== India ===
- Mahmud of Ghazni (971–1030) (lover of Malik Ayaz)
- Alauddin Khalji (1266–1316) (lover of Malik Kafur)
- Qutbuddin Mubarak Shah
- Khusrau Khan
- Babur (1483–1530) (lover of Baburi Andijani)
- Vishwanath Singh (1866–1932)
- Manvendra Singh Gohil (1965–)

=== Iran ===
- Ismail I (1487–1524)
- Ismail II (1537–1577)

=== Iraq ===
- Abd al-Ilah (1913–1958)

=== Italy ===
- Nero (37–68), Roman Emperor (from 54 to 68) (lover of Sporus and Pythagoras)
- Hadrian (76–138), Roman Emperor (from 117 to 138) (lover of Antinous)
- Elagabalus (204–222), Roman Emperor (from 218 to 222) (lover of Aurelius Zoticus and Hierocles)
- Brunetto Latini (1220-1294) (disputed, only source is Dante's Divine Comedy)
- Anna Sforza (1476-1497)
- Francesco Melzi (1491-1570) (lover of Leonardo da Vinci, his own teacher Andrea del Verrocchio, prostitute Jacopo Saltarelli, and Da Vinci's pupil Salaì)
- Pier Luigi Farnese, Duke of Parma (1503–1547)
- Laudomia Forteguerri (1515–1555)
- Ferdinando II de' Medici, Grand Duke of Tuscany (1610–1670)
- Charles II Gonzaga, Duke of Mantua and Montferrat (1629–1665)
- Gian Gastone de' Medici, Grand Duke of Tuscany (1671–1737)
- Eugenia Rasponi (1873–1958)
- Adalberto of Savoy, Duke of Bergamo (1898–1982)
- Umberto II of Italy (1904-1983)
- Luchino Visconti (1906-1976)

=== Japan ===
- Fujiwara no Yorinaga (1120–1156) (lover of Fujiwara no Narichika)
- Ashikaga Yoshimitsu (1358–1408) (lover of Zeami Motokiyo)
- Hosokawa Takakuni (1484-1531)
- Takeda Shingen (1521-1573)
- Kōsaka Masanobu (1527-1578)
- Toyotomi Hidetsugu (1568-1595)
- Tokugawa Iemitsu (1604-1651)
- Prince Kan'in Haruhito (1902-1988)

=== Korea ===
- Hyegong of Silla (758-780)
- Gongmin of Goryeo (1330-1374)
- Deposed Crown Princess Bong (1414–?)

=== Monaco ===
- Pierre of Monaco, Duke of Valentinois (1895–1964)

=== Netherlands ===
- William III of Orange (1650 - 1702)
- William II of the Netherlands (1792-1849)

=== Norway ===
- Maud Angelica Behn (2003–)

=== Poland ===
- Władysław III of Poland (1424–1444) (uncertain)
- Janusz Aleksander Sanguszko (1712–1775) (lover of Jerzy Marcin Lubomirski)
- Alexander Hochberg (1905-1984)

=== Portugal ===
- Peter I of Portugal (1320-1367) (uncertain, disputed bisexual; in spite of his fateful passion for Inês de Castro)
- Prince Henry the Navigator (1394-1460) (a lifelong bachelor, in spite of an aggressive and energetic character he "never knew a woman", strong male attachments; deeply mourned the death of a companion in arms, to the point of his deceased friend's mother telling him: "Ha! Lord, what's all this? Where is your royal virtue, your dignity and your youth, to thus weep and mourn like a woman? This is very improper of you."; in his household he was surrounded by male youths that later became his trustworthy naval explorers; seems to be consumed by a taste for fashionable and elegant dress)
- Rodrigo da Câmara (1594-1662)
- Afonso VI of Portugal (1643-1683) (suspect and intimate friendship with Antonio Conti, an opportunistic Genovese dressmaker)
- John VI of Portugal (1767-1826)
- José de Meneses da Silveira e Castro, 2nd Marquis of Valada (1826–1895)
- Manuel II of Portugal (1889-1932) (uncertain; barren marriage)

=== Russia ===
- Prince Vladimir Meshchersky (1839-1914)
- Grand Duke Sergei Alexandrovich of Russia (1857–1905) (uncertain, disputed)
- Grand Duke Konstantin Konstantinovich of Russia (1858-1915)
- Grand Duke Nicholas Mikhailovich of Russia (1859–1919) (uncertain, disputed)
- Grand Duke Dmitry Konstantinovich of Russia (1860–1919)
- Duke Peter Alexandrovich of Oldenburg (1868–1924)
- Georgy Chicherin (1872–1936)
- Maria Nirod (1879–1965)
- Prince Felix Yusupov (1887–1967)
- Baron George Hoyningen-Huene (1900–1968)

=== Spain ===
- Henry IV of Castile (1425–1474) (uncertain, disputed)
- Louis I of Spain (1707-1724)
- Isabella of Parma (1741-1763)
- Francisco de Asís, King Consort of Spain (1822-1902)
- Infante Luis Fernando of Spain (1888–1945)
- Ataúlfo of Orléans (1913–1974)
- Luisa Isabel Álvarez de Toledo, 21st Duchess of Medina Sidonia (1936-2008)

=== Sweden ===
- Christina, Queen of Sweden (1626-1689) (lover of Ebba Sparre)
- Hedvig Elisabeth Charlotte of Holstein-Gottorp (1759-1818) (uncertain, presumed lover of Sophie Piper and Frederica of Baden)
- Gustav V (1858-1950) (uncertain, disputed)
- Eugen, Duke of Närke (1865–1947)

=== Thailand ===
- Vajiravudh (1881–1925) (uncertain)

=== Uganda ===
- Mwanga II of Buganda (1868-1903)

=== Vatican and Holy See ===
- Pope Benedict IX (c. 1012-1056) (bisexual)
- Pope Paul II (1464–1471)
- Pope Sixtus IV (1471–1484)
- Pope Julius II (1443–1513)
- Pope Leo X (1513–1521)
- Pope Julius III (1487–1555)
- Cardinal Innocenzo Ciocchi Del Monte (1532–1577)
- Cardinal Scipione Borghese (1577–1633)
- Cardinal Henry Benedict Stuart (Henry IX in the Jacobite succession, 1725–1807)
- Pope Paul VI (1897–1978) (Alleged affair with Italian actor Paolo Carlini, denied)

=== Vietnam ===
- Khải Định (1885–1925)

== See also ==
- King & King, a 2002 children's book in which a prince marries a prince
- Red, White & Royal Blue, a novel about a relationship between the Prince of England and the First Son of the United States
- Young Royals, a 2021 Netflix series about a gay Swedish prince
