= The Princes and the Treasure =

- Author: Jeffrey A. Miles
- Illustrator: J. L. Phillips
- Language: English
- Genre: Children's books, LGBT
- Published: 2014
- Publisher: Handsome Prince Publishing
- Publication place: United States
- Media type: Print, e-book
- Pages: 30 pages
- ISBN: 978-0-9910536-3-6 (first edition, hardback)
- Followed by: The Princes and the Dragon

The Princes and the Treasure is a children's picture book and fairy tale by Jeffrey A. Miles, featuring illustrations by J. L. Phillips. The book was first published in the United States on February 9, 2014, through Handsome Prince Publishing, and has been translated into 26 languages and is available in over 137 countries. The story follows two men tasked with saving a princess, only to discover their love for one another.

A sequel entitled The Princes and the Dragon has been written and will focus upon Earnest and Gallant's life raising twin boys.

== Plot ==
The strong and capable Princess Elena has a problem – her father, King Rufus, has been pressuring her to marry a prince, despite her own desire not to marry a prince. In desperation Elena makes a wish and is whisked away by an old woman in a carriage, prompting her father to announce that he will marry Elena to any one that can rescue her. The request is answered by two men, the reluctant and shy bookworm Earnest and the strong and handsome Gallant. They eventually manage to make their way to the tower where Elena is being held, only for the old woman to demand that they bring her the "greatest treasure in the land" in exchange for the princess. Assuming that she meant physical goods, Earnest and Gallant seek out the land's five greatest treasures, only to fall in love in the process discover that the greatest treasure isn't a physical good but rather their love for one another. They return to the old woman with their answer, at which point she transforms into a beautiful enchantress and Elena is freed. The three return to the King, who is overjoyed at his daughter's return and gives the two men gold, land, and makes them both princes. The story ends with the marriage of the two princes, who live happily ever after in their own castle.

== Development ==
Miles came up with the idea for The Princes and the Treasure during a visit to the Magic Kingdom, where he watched adult performers singing and dancing together as prince and princess couples. This caused him to note the absence of same sex pairings in children's fairy tales and upon returning home, began developing the story and characters. While writing the story Miles chose not to have the characters of Gallant and Earnest kiss, as he did not want the book to be seen as sexual, and he based the characters of both men on an amalgamation of people he knew in real life. He has also stated that he wanted the book to show that "two men or two women can create a warm and loving family together".

== Characters ==
Prince Earnest
Earnest is a shy, red-haired bookworm that is hesitant to leave the safety of his own home, as he would rather read about adventures rather than go on one himself. He leaves his house only after his mother commands him to go and during his adventures with Gallant. Earnest tends to solve the challenges he faces by using his brains, and knowledge from the many adventure stories he has read.
Prince Gallant
Gallant is the strongest and most handsome man in the kingdom of Evergreen, and is widely admired. Unlike Earnest, Gallant eagerly volunteers to rescue Princess Elena and during his adventures he tends to solve the challenges he faces by using his brawn and muscles
Princess Elena
Elena is a beautiful, kind, warm, and funny princess. At the story's start she is pressured by her father to marry an eligible prince, which is not how Princess Elena wants to live her life.
Enchantress / Old Woman
The Enchantress is initially portrayed as an old, weathered woman that whisks Elena away and sequesters her in a dark tower. When confronted by Earnest and Gallant she sets them on a task to bring her the "greatest treasure in the land", which sets them on a lengthy adventure. By the story's end she has revealed herself to be a beautiful enchantress capable of transforming her shape.
King Rufus
Rufus is a caring and protective single father that wants his daughter to be happy in life. To this end he pressures Elena to marry a prince, as he believes that this would also secure the future well-being of their kingdom.

== Reception ==
Critical reception for The Princes and the Treasure has been positive. The Princes and the Treasure has received praise from GLAAD, who expressed excitement over the work containing "gay role models, the twist on a classic fairytale storyline, and the shattering of stereotypes". Lesbians on the Loose gave the book a favorable review, stating that it was "important, particularly for children as it shows that love and family are universal, regardless of their gender." Miles has also been approached by many parents, who use the book to discuss same sex relationships and marriage with their children.

The book has received criticism from conservative groups such as the American Family Association for its placement in public libraries and schools.

== Film adaptation ==
In November 2014 the satirical website Amplifying Glass posted a story claiming that Disney had picked up the rights to The Princes and the Treasure, which they would release under the title of Princes in the fall of 2015. The article went viral, causing many to assume that the claims were legitimate and share the news via various social media and news websites such as Facebook. The author of the piece stated that they did not intend for it to be taken seriously and that they had written the article in response to a comment made on an article by the Christian Post, which negatively compared homosexuality to eating disorders. The comment angered the author, who then wrote the article in order to "push the issue of equality a little and also, I admit, to troll some of the haters out there."

== See also ==
- King & King (2002)
- Prince & Knight (2018)
- Maiden & Princess (2019)
