= Eribolum =

Port town of ancient Bithynia

Coordinates: 40°41′38″N 29°53′40″E

Eribolum, Eribolon (Ancient Greek: Ἐρίβωλον), Eribolus, Eribolos (Ἐρίβωλος), or Eriboia (Ἐριβοία) was a port town of ancient Bithynia, on the Sinus Astacenus near Nicomedia. It appears in the Tabula Peutingeriana under the name of Eribulo, south of the bay of Astacus, with the numeral XII, and north of Nicaea; the figure of a house in the Tabula indicates a town, perhaps with warm springs. It is Hyribolum in the Jerusalem Itinerary. Cassius Dio speaks of it as a naval station opposite to Nicomedia. After the Battle of Antioch (in 218), the Roman emperor Macrinus fled to Eribolum seeking passage westwards while avoiding the large port of Nicomedia whose governor was in favour of the emperor Heliogabalus.

Its site is located near Yeniköy, in Asiatic Turkey.
