= Jean Lombard =

French novelist (1854 – 1891)

Jean Lombard (26 September 1854 – 17 July 1891) was a French novelist of the late nineteenth century.

Lombard was born in Toulon, Var. His work, with its themes of orientalism, androgyny and paganism, had deep affiliations with the Decadent movement in literature. Although almost completely forgotten today, he influenced contemporaries such as Rachilde and Jean Lorrain. His best-known work, based on the Roman emperor Heliogabalus, is L'Agonie (1888); the 1902 reprint included a preface by Octave Mirbeau and illustrations by Auguste Leroux. According to William Sharp, Lombard died in 1891 in poverty, bordering on starvation.
