= Battle of Antioch (218) =

Roman battle between rivals for the throne

Coordinates: 36.2000°N 36.1500°E

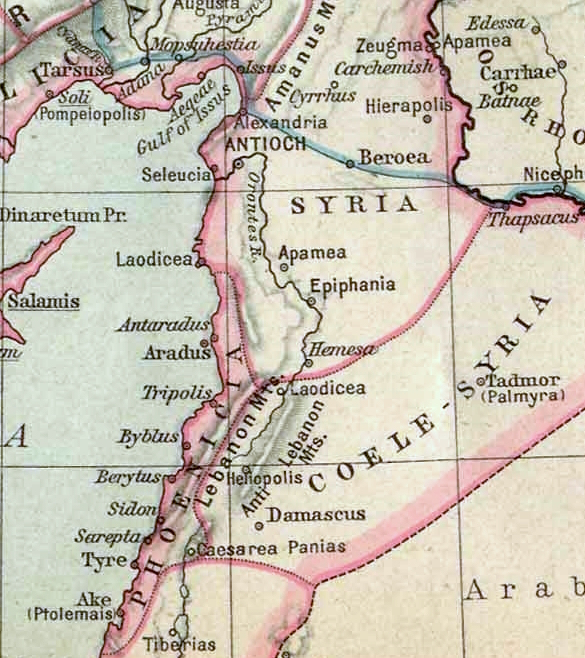
- A 20th century map of Roman Syria with the ancient sites of Antioch, Emesa (Hemesa), and Zeugma shown, among others
Date	8 June AD 218
Location	near Antioch, Roman Syria (now Turkey)
Result	Victory for Elagabalus

Belligerents
Macrinus	Elagabalus

Commanders and leaders
Macrinus	Gannys

Strength
Elements of the Praetorian Guard	Legio III Gallica; Legio II Parthica; Other rebels

The Battle of Antioch (8 June 218) was fought between the Roman army of the Emperor Macrinus and his rival Elagabalus, whose troops were commanded by General Gannys, probably a short distance from Antioch. Gannys's victory led to Macrinus's downfall as emperor and his replacement by Elagabalus.

Macrinus was elevated to the throne with the support of the Roman army following the assassination of his predecessor, Caracalla, by a disaffected soldier whilst on campaign against Parthia on 8 April 217. Macrinus may have played a role in orchestrating the assassination. He inherited all of the problems that Caracalla's reign had left for Rome: war against Parthia, threats from Armenia and Dacia, and extensive fiscal expenditures. Macrinus successfully concluded a peace with Parthia, but at considerable cost to Rome and implemented policies to reduce monetary expenditures which stoked discontent within the military.

Caracalla's aunt, Julia Maesa, took advantage of the soldiers's discontent, spending her wealth to champion her grandson, Elagabalus, as the rightful heir to the empire. Elagabalus, chief priest of the god Elagabal, was proclaimed emperor by the soldiers of Legio III Gallica at their camp in Raphanea on 16 May 218. In response, Macrinus sent one of his generals, Ulpius Julianus, with a small cavalry force to quell the rebellious soldiers, though they defected, killed Ulpius Julianus and sent his head back to Macrinus in Antioch. The battle took place less than a month later.

While Gannys had the numerical advantage, in the opening stages of the battle Macrinus's Praetorian Guard broke through Gannys's lines causing his troops to flee. In response, Elagabalus's mother and grandmother joined the battle rallying the troops, while Gannys led a charge moving his troops to renew the assault and leading Macrinus to flee to Antioch in fear. He sent his son and co-emperor, Diadumenian, to Parthia and tried to return to Rome, but both were caught en route and executed. Elagabalus entered Antioch as the new emperor of Rome, and with Macrinus dead, the Senate had no choice but to accede to his ascension. By March 222, Elagabalus was also assassinated by the disgruntled Praetorian Guard, declared an enemy of Rome, and subjected to a damnatio memoriae.

== Background ==
=== Death of Caracalla and rise of Macrinus ===
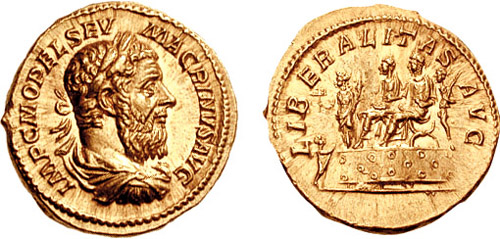
Roman aurei depicting Macrinus and his son, Diadumenian

Macrinus' predecessor Caracalla was murdered on April 8, 217, during a period of war with the Parthians, near Carrhae while traveling en route to visit a temple. His murderer was Justin Martialus, a soldier who was incensed after being declined the rank of centurion. Martialus was himself cut down by Caracalla's German Guards immediately afterwards, a convenient fact for Macrinus, at the time a praetorian prefect, who was involved in the assassination. One reason for Macrinus to have intrigued against Caracalla was out of fear for his own life. A story documented by the Roman writer Herodian and supported by some later historians details the events leading to Caracalla's death. The story goes that Macrinus, in the course of his employment, was often tasked with reading dispatches sent to Caracalla for him. One such dispatch detailed a prophecy, perhaps fabricated, from the oracle at Delphi suggesting that Macrinus was destined to kill Caracalla and succeed him as emperor.

In the immediate aftermath of Caracalla's death, Adventus was selected to serve as emperor, but he declined the position due to his old age. The army then chose Macrinus; they had no feelings of 'love or esteem' towards him, but there was no one else competing for the position. The army proclaimed Macrinus as emperor three days after the death of Caracalla, and named him Augustus.

The results were applauded by the Senate at first, who were glad to be rid of the former emperor. But tradition held that the emperor could only be selected from among the Senate; moreover, Macrinus was a member of the equestrian class, the lower of the two aristocratic classes. These disadvantages led the Senate to severely scrutinize his every action. Their opposition, however, was not backed by any actual power. The military at the time was concentrated against the Parthians in the area around Edessa (modern Şanlıurfa, Turkey), so there was no force anywhere in the Empire that could contest the status of Macrinus.

As the new emperor, Macrinus had to deal with the major threat of the Parthians, with whom Rome were currently at war. An indecisive battle at Nisibis is cited as a reason for the opening of peace negotiations. Negotiations may have been favourable for both sides; Rome was being threatened by Armenia and Dacia, and the Parthians were far from home and low on supplies. The settlement, however, was viewed by many people as being unfavourable to Rome. The Roman historian Cassius Dio wrote that a concession of 200 million Sesterces was rendered to the Parthians in exchange for peace. Historian Andrew Scott doubts the credibility of this high figure, noting that Dio's records are frequently unreliable on finances. Regardless, the prevailing opinion accuses Macrinus of being cowardly and weak during negotiations.

With the peace treaty concluded, Macrinus took measures to control the expenditures of Rome, by reversing Caracalla's changes and thus effectively reinstating the fiscal policies of Septimius Severus. This included a reduction in pay and benefits for legionaries, which was not popular with the army who had placed him in command. These policies applied only to new recruits, but the enlisted soldiers saw this as setting precedent for further changes to the fiscal policies brought in by Caracalla. The sullen behaviour of new recruits, who entered service committing to greater labour for less payment, only furthered discontent among the soldiers. Edward Gibbon suggests that from here only a small spark was required to ignite a rebellion.

=== Rise of Elagabalus ===
Following the death of Caracalla, Macrinus allowed Caracalla's mother, Julia Domna, and his aunt, Julia Maesa, to settle in their home town of Emesa. Julia Domna, who was working in Antioch at the time of Caracalla's death, attempted suicide and eventually succeeded by starving herself. Her sister Julia Maesa, however, returned to Emesa with her family finances intact.

Julia's suspicions regarding Macrinus's involvement in the death of Caracalla led to her championing the case of her grandson, Elagabalus, as the rightful emperor. At the time Elagabalus was the chief priest of the Phoenician god Elagabal in Emesa. The soldiers nearby frequently visited the temple where Elagabalus was chief priest, to watch him perform his rituals and ceremonies. At one of these visits, Julia Maesa took the opportunity to inform the soldiers, it is not known whether truthfully, that Elagabalus was Caracalla's son. Simultaneously, she may have seen the opportunity to use her family's wealth and prestige to set in motion her plot.

On the night of 15 May 218, Elagabalus was taken, by either Julia Maesa or Gannys, to the camp of the Legio III Gallica at Raphanea and presented to the soldiers stationed there. In one account of the events, Elegabalus was saluted as Antoninus by the soldiers, after his supposed father Caracalla whose official name was Marcus Aurelius Antoninus. Enticed by Julia's bribes, the legion proclaimed Elagabalus the rightful Emperor of Rome on 16 May 218. In Gibbon's opinion, Macrinus might have been able to stop the rebellion in this early stage, but failed to contain it because he was unable to decide on an appropriate course of action and instead remained at Antioch.

=== Rebellion ===
With the support of an entire legion, other legionaries, prompted by discontent over pay, deserted Macrinus and joined Elagabalus's ranks as well. In response to the growing threat, Macrinus sent out a cavalry force under the command of Ulpius Julianus to try to regain control of the rebel soldiers. Rather than capturing the rebel forces, the cavalry instead killed Ulpius and defected to Elagabalus.

Following these events, Macrinus traveled to Apamea to ensure the loyalty of Legio II Parthica before setting off to march against Emesa. According to Dio, Macrinus appointed his son Diadumenian to the position of Imperator, and promised the soldiers 20,000 Sesterces each, with 4,000 of these to be paid on the spot. Dio further comments that Macrinus hosted a dinner for the residents of Apamea in honour of Diadumenian. At the dinner, Macrinus was supposedly presented with the head of Ulpius Julianus who had been killed by his soldiers. In response, Macrinus left Apamea and headed south.

Macrinus's and Elagabalus's troops met somewhere near the border of Syria Coele and Syria Phoenice. Despite Macrinus's efforts to quell the rebellion at this engagement, his whole legion defected to Elagabalus forcing Macrinus to retire to Antioch. Elagabus took to the offensive and marched on Antioch.

=== Senatorial response ===
By the early third century, the balance of power had shifted from the Senate to the army, and the position of the Senate was considerably weakened. The emperor of Rome was appointed by the support of the military, while the Senate existed solely to officiate state affairs without any real authority. Both Macrinus and later Elagabalus secured the support of the military while generally disregarding the opinion of the Senate. Macrinus was in dire circumstances after Elagabalus's rebellion and had no other choice but to turn to the Senate for assistance. While in Antioch, Macrinus made one final attempt at securing support, this time from Rome. A combination of distrust from the Senate, insufficient funds, and Elagabalus's impending approach, however, forced Macrinus to face Elagabalus's approaching legions with only his Praetorian Guard. Had more time had been available, the Urban Prefect of Rome, Marius Maximus, might have been able to muster troops to send as reinforcements to assist Macrinus. Despite their relative powerlessness, the Senate still declared war against the usurper and his family.

== Battle ==
Descriptions of the battle differ, and its location is debated. The decisive and perhaps sole engagement took place on 8 June 218; Dio places it at a defile outside of a village believed to be Immae, approximately twenty-four miles or so by road between Antioch and Beroea. Herodian challenges this assertion, suggesting that the battle took place closer to the borders of Syria Coele and Syria Phoenice, possibly near Emesa. Downey then suggests that two battles took place: an initial engagement matching the one described by Herodian, and a later battle near Antioch, which Downey agrees was the decisive point in the rebellion. Other historians either support Dio's suggested site near Antioch or make no claim with regards to the location of the engagement.

Elagabalus's armies, commanded by the inexperienced but determined Gannys, engaged Macrinus's Praetorian Guard in a narrowly fought pitched battle. Gannys commanded at least two full legions and held numerical superiority over the fewer levies that Macrinus had been able to raise. Nonetheless, the engagement began in Macrinus's favour. According to Dio, Macrinus had ordered the Praetorian Guard to set aside their scale armour breastplates and grooved shields in favour of lighter oval shields prior to the battle. This made them lighter and more manoeuvrable and negated any advantage the legionary lanciarii (javelin-armed light infantry) had. The Praetorian Guards broke through the lines of Gannys's force, which turned to flee. During the retreat, however, Julia Maesa and Soaemias Bassiana (Elagabalus's mother) joined the fray to rally the forces while Gannys charged on horseback headlong into the enemy. These actions effectively ended the retreat; the troops resumed the assault with renewed morale, turning the tide of battle. Fearing defeat, Macrinus fled back to the city of Antioch. Both Downey and Gibbon suggest that had Macrinus not fled, he might have eventually gained victory and secured his position as emperor.

== Aftermath ==
After his defeat, Macrinus sent his son Diadumenian to Artabanus V of Parthia, while he himself returned to Antioch, proclaiming himself victorious over Elagabalus in battle. News of Macrinus's defeat spread and many civilians who had supported him were slain in the city and on the roads. Macrinus shaved off his beard and hair to disguise himself as a member of the military police. Fleeing the city at night on horseback, he reached Cilicia with a few companions, masquerading as a military courier, and secured a carriage to drive to Eribolon, near Nicomedia. From there he set sail for Chalcedon.

Macrinus travelled through Cappadocia, Galatia and Bithynia before arriving in Chalcedon. Here he was arrested, his guise revealed after he had sent requests for money. Men dispatched by Elagabalus apprehended Macrinus and brought him to Cappadocia. Diadumenian was captured elsewhere on his journey to Parthia, and killed by the centurion Cladius Pollio in Zeugma. French author Jean-Baptiste Crevier comments that Macrinus threw himself out of the carriage at Cappadocia after receiving the news of the death of his son, breaking his shoulder in the act. Macrinus was executed in Archelais in Cappadocia after attempting to escape; Dio mentions that the centurion Marcianus Taurus was responsible for his execution. Thus, the reign of Macrinus as emperor of Rome ended after nearly fourteen months.

In the meantime, Elagabalus had entered Antioch and declared himself the new ruler of Rome in a message to the Roman Senate and people. Once again, as they had done with Macrinus, the Senate were forced to recognize Elagabalus as the new emperor. Elagabalus's claim was not uncontested, as several others made their own bids for the imperial purple. These included Verus, the commander of Legio III Gallica and Gellius Maximus, the commander of Legio IV Scythica. History professor and author Martijn Icks notes the irony of Verus's claim as his legion had been the first to proclaim Elagabalus as the rightful emperor of Rome. These rebellions were quashed and their instigators executed. By March 222 AD, Elagabalus was himself murdered by the Praetorian Guard, his body dumped in the river Tiber and his memory condemned by damnatio memoriae ordered by the senate.
