= Gannys =

Roman general and tutor of emperor Elagabalus (died 218)

Personal details
- Died: 218 Nicomedia, Bithynia, Roman Empire (modern-day İzmit, Kocaeli, Turkey)

Military service
- Allegiance: Roman Empire
- Rank: General
- Battles/wars: Battle of Antioch (218)

Gannys (gr. Γάννυς or Γαίννυς) was a Roman general who commanded the troops of Elagabalus (officially named Antoninus) against Emperor Macrinus in the Battle of Antioch.

According to Edward Gibbon in his Decline and Fall of the Roman Empire:

Antoninus himself, who in the rest of his life never acted like a man, in this important crisis of his fate approved himself a hero, mounted his horse, and, at the head of his rallied troops, charged sword in hand among the thickest enemies; whilst the eunuch Gannys, whose occupation had been confined to female cares and the soft luxury of Asia, displayed the talents of an able and experienced general.

The contemporary historian Cassius Dio writes:

Now in the battle Gannys made haste to occupy the pass in front of the village and drew up his troops in good order for fighting, in spite of the fact that he was utterly without experience in military affairs and had spent his life in luxury. But of such great assistance is good fortune in all situations alike that it actually bestows understanding upon the ignorant.

On the way to Rome, Elagabalus and his entourage spent the winter of 218 in Bithynia at Nicomedia, where Gannys was put to death. Cassius Dio suggests that Gannys, a virtual "foster-father and guardian" to the new emperor, was killed because he pressured Elagabalus to live "temperately and prudently":

Gannys was living rather luxuriously and was fond of accepting bribes, but for all that he did no one any harm and bestowed many benefits upon many people. Most of all, he showed great zeal for the emperor and was thoroughly satisfactory to Maesa and Soaemis [the emperor's grandmother and mother], to the former because he had been reared by her, and to the latter because he was virtually her husband. But ... the emperor put him out of the way ... because he was forced by Gannys to live temperately and prudently. And he himself was the first to give Gannys a mortal blow with his own hand, since no one of the soldiers had the hardihood to take the lead in murdering him.
