= King & King =

2000 picture book by Stern Nijland and Linda De Haan

- Authors: Linda de Haan and Stern Nijland
- Original title: Koning & Koning
- Cover artist: Linda de Haan and Stern Nijland
- Language: Frisian
- Subject: Marriage, weddings, gay love, princes
- Genre: Children's fiction
- Publisher: Netherlands: Gottmer; USA: Tricycle Press
- Publication date: 2000
- English publication date: 2002
- Media type: Print
- Pages: 32
- ISBN: 978-1-58246-061-1
- OCLC: 26563465
- Followed by: King & King & Family

King & King is a children's picture book co-authored and co-illustrated by Stern Nijland and Linda De Haan, first published in 2000. King & King tells the story of a young prince whose mother is forcing him to find his princess. However, after meeting many princesses, the prince falls in love with another prince. King & King was originally written in Frisian and has since been published in ten languages. The book's illustrations have received both positive and negative reviews, as has the storyline. The book has been analyzed for both its usefulness in the classroom and its challenges to social norms.

The book has gained some prominence due to opposition from social conservatives who believe that children should not see LGBT themes; attention as a result of this opposition greatly increased sales of the book.

== Plot ==
"On the tallest mountain above town," the young Prince Bertie still has not married, as is the custom in his kingdom. His mother, a grouchy Queen who is tired of ruling and wishes to pass on the responsibility to her son, insists he must find a princess to marry. The prince tells his mom "Very well, Mother.... I must say, though, I've never cared much for princesses." His mother marches princess after princess through the castle, from places ranging from Greenland to Mumbai, but in spite of their various talents — Princess Aria of Austria sings opera, Princess Dolly from Texas juggles and does magic tricks — they fail to interest the prince (though the prince's page falls in love with the princess from Greenland). After a while, along comes Princess Madeleine escorted by her brother Prince Lee. At the same time, both Bertie and Lee exclaim, "What a wonderful prince!" The princes immediately fall in love, and they begin marriage preparations at once. The wedding is attended by all the rejected princesses and their families; the two princes are declared King and King, and the Queen can finally relax, sunning herself in a lounge chair near the page and the princess from Greenland. The story ends with a kiss between the two kings.

== Publication ==
It was originally written in Frisian ("Koning & Koning") and published in the Netherlands in 2000, but has since been published in ten languages. A stage adaptation has been performed globally, from Vienna to Mexico City. In the United States, it was published by Berkeley, California-based Tricycle Press (the children's imprint of Ten Speed Press) in 2002; as of 2009, 20,000 copies have been sold in the United States. At Tricycle Press' request a sequel, King & King & Family, about the kings adopting a child, appeared in 2004.

== Style and genre ==
King & King is a fictional children's picture book intended for ages 6 and older that combines both illustrations and text. The illustrations are created as collages with cut paper and mixed-media art, including ink and paint.

The book's illustrations have been a point of disagreement amongst reviewers, who disagree if the illustrations add or distract from the story. The book and the illustrations were critiqued by Horn book Magazine, Lambda Book Report, The School Library, Publishers Weekly, and Bulletin of the Center for Children's Books. Roger Sutton of the Horn Book Magazine called the illustrations "silly but affectionate collage illustrations." Sutton claims that this style of collage complements the "text for whimsical irreverence." Nancy Garde of the Lambda Book Report also positively reviewed the illustrations. She described the illustrations, noting the fun details and objects to be found on the pages. She also mentions the "colorful cut-paper collages," but she describes them as "big and brash." The School Library described the illustrations as "cluttered, disjointed, ill-conceived art." The review says that the artwork takes away from the overall message of the book, as it distracts the audience from the fun and positive details in the book. Publishers Weekly also condemned the illustration in the book, noting the ugly color scheme, inconsistent body and image shapes and ugly characters. The distasteful images caused Publishers Weekly to recommend a different book with a similarly diverse theme, rather than reading King & King. The Bulletin of the Center for Children's Books similarly described the fully filled pages, but rather than describing them negatively, Deborah Stevenson from Bulletin of the Center for Children's Books characterized the illustrations as "joyously informal pageantry."

== Reception and analysis ==
King & King has been reviewed by the School Library Journal, Kirkus Reviews, the Horn Book Magazine and Publishers Weekly. It earned an Honorable Mention in the "most unusual book of the year" category for Publishers Weekly's 2002 "Off the Cuff Awards." San Francisco Chronicle called the book "progressive" and "inclusive" and The Philadelphia Gay News said it was a "great book to teach young readers about same-sex couples." It was an Inside/Out Book Club selection and was a Lambda Literary Award finalist in 2002.

A program called "No Outsiders," backed by the British Department for Education, used King and King as a teaching tool for introducing students to gay issues, with one of its aims being the prevention of bullying of students who are perceived to be LGBT or who have LGBT parents. The program was inspired by Archbishop Desmond Tutu's remarks, "Everyone is an insider, there are no outsiders — whatever their beliefs, whatever their color, gender or sexuality."

Amy T.Y. Lai's "Waiving the Magic Wand: Forging greater open-mindedness by subverting the conventions of fairy tales" discusses the book in the context of a 2001 Yale Journal of Law and the Humanities article which argues that fairy tales play "an even greater role in shaping lawful behaviour than the recorded law, because it lies at the heart of the children's literary canon and has a much greater claim to universality of influence … Not only do young children lack the critical faculties necessary to challenge the "truth" offered by these stories, but the jurisprudence of fairy tales maps onto a child's developmental phase of moral reasoning." Lai asserts that King & King is part of a "growing canon of contemporary fairy tales" that challenge traditional doctrines and subvert their ideologies by sidestepping the "trap of prolonging an oppressive punitive system." Lai continues to say that the book challenges social norms "by including many unconventional elements, including single motherhood and alternative families. Most importantly, it lays out a gay-positive story with an ending that is gratifying for all parties, but without consciously constructing something like a judicial opinion that imposes a new legal or, worse still, punitive standard upon its reader."

== Opposition ==
The image of the Princes kissing each other at their wedding on the final page has been cited by social conservatives as "gay-rights movements undermining religious freedom," but the U.S. Court of Appeals ruled in favor of schools "promoting tolerance".

King & King's LGBT content—it is believed to be the first image of two men romantically kissing portrayed in a children's book—has led many social conservatives to challenge it, on both a local and a national level. These challenges have included attempts to ban the book, to prevent it being used as a teaching tool, or to restrict children's exposure to it by removing it from school or public library shelves or by placing it in sections which young children cannot access.

=== Banned book ===
The American Library Association (ALA) "defines a "challenged book" as one that has received a formal, written complaint, filed with a library or school. The complaint on a challenged book includes a request that a book be removed from the shelf, or placed in a special section (usually available only to adults).

In a study of banned and challenged picture and primary books because of lesbian, gay, bisexual, transgender, and queer/questioning (LGBTQ) concerns covering the twenty years (1989–2009) for which data was available, King & King was fourth on the list after Daddy's Roommate by Michael Willhoite (1st), Heather Has Two Mommies by Lesléa Newman (2nd) and And Tango Makes Three by Peter Parnell (3rd). In their list of all banned and challenged books for 2000–2009, King & King is 20th out of 100. In time for Banned Books Week (last week of September) in 2005, the ALA introduced Banned Books bracelets featuring covers of the popular challenged books, King & King is one of the six offered in children's sizes.

ALA banned books in all categories

- 2003, 9th
- 2004, 8th

The American Booksellers Association, books in all categories

- 2004, King & King & Family (2nd)
- 2005, King & King (4th) 2005

The Independent Bookseller Association

- King & King was 2004's most frequently challenged title.

=== Controversy in Chicago ===
The University of Chicago Laboratory Schools annually vote to grant an award to a children's book. In 2003, King & King was one of the finalists for this award, which raised controversy amongst parents about King & King's plot. Some parents were angry that the school neglected to inform the parents before teaching their children about homosexual relationships because it is a controversial theme.

The Chicago Tribune attributes this controversy to more than homophobic parents but an increasing unease of the lack of control over their children. The Tribune also uses this book to discuss when parents should discuss controversial topics with their kids.

=== National significance ===
In response to King & King, Congressman Walter B. Jones (R – North Carolina) proposed a law in 2005 called the Parental Empowerment Act, which would have established national boards composed of parents to review books purchased by elementary schools, and which would have prohibited states that did not do so from receiving federal education funding. "You can't ban the book," said Jones. "This is the only way to do it." The bill died in committee.

In September 2007, Democratic primary front-runners were asked, in one of their debates, their opinion on the book and whether they were comfortable with children having access to it. John Edwards and Barack Obama strongly supported it, while Hillary Clinton described it as an issue of "parental discretion."

=== Conflict in Oklahoma ===
In 2005, in Oklahoma, 75 members of the state's legislature signed a petition for the Oklahoma Metropolitan Library System (OMLS) to force libraries to place the children's book in the adult section. At the May 2005 hearing of the Public Services Committee many of the speakers asserted that "children's books showing family situations different from traditional marriage are pornography," which the executive director of the OMLS denied stating, "none of the material in question is illegal or pornographic." Later that month the OMLS Commission voted 10–7 to move "easy, easy-reader, and tween" books containing "sensitive or controversial" themes to an area that could only be accessed by adults. The decision was based primarily on concern by social conservatives that books that advocate acceptance of homosexuality, such as King & King, were accessible by children. Staff of the Library system opposed such restrictions, and the American Library Association strongly condemned the decision. Prior, state representative Sally Kern had spearheaded an effort to keep such books away from children; in May 2005, the Oklahoma House passed a nonbinding House resolution 1039, also introduced by Kern, to "confine homosexually themed books and other age-inappropriate material to areas exclusively for adult access and distribution." The Commission's decision was implemented in February 2006 as a "Family Talk" section that contained such controversial content. Further restrictions were added in November 2008, when the Commission added the requirement that such material must be placed at least 60 inches off the ground in order to be out of the reach of many children.

=== Federal lawsuit ===
In 2006 Robb and Robin Wirthlin and David and Tonia Parker filed a federal lawsuit against the school district of Estabrook Elementary School, which their second graders attended in Lexington, Massachusetts. The Wirthlins' son's teacher had read King & King aloud to the class as part of an educational unit on weddings. Parents countered that the school's job was to teach about the world and that Massachusetts sanctioned same-sex marriage. The plaintiffs claimed that using the book in school constituted sex education without parental notification, which would be a violation of their civil rights and state law. Robin Wirthlin appeared on CNN, saying,

We felt like seven years old is not appropriate to introduce homosexual themes. […] My problem is that this issue of romantic attraction between two men is being presented to my seven-year-old as wonderful, and good and the way things should be. […] Let us know and let us excuse our child from the discussion.

The judge dismissed the lawsuit, saying "Diversity is a hallmark of our nation."

The Wirthlins and the Parkers appealed the decision; a three-judge panel of the First Circuit Court of Appeals ruled unanimously in favor of the school. Judge Sandra Lynch, writing for the court, rejected the plaintiff's argument that their religious beliefs were being singled out as well as their argument that their First Amendment right to free exercise of religion was violated, writing, "There is no evidence of systemic indoctrination. There is no allegation that [the second-grader] was asked to affirm gay marriage. Requiring a student to read a particular book is generally not coercive of free exercise rights." The court also ruled that the parents' substantive due process rights were not violated, as these rights did not legally give them the degree of control they sought over the curriculum.

=== Other locations ===
In March 2004 the Associated Press reported on the Hartsells of Wilmington, North Carolina, who are the parents of a then first-grader who brought the book home which ends with "the two princes kissing with a red heart covering their lips." The Hartsells condemned the accessibility of the book by stating, "My child is not old enough to understand something like that, especially when it is not in our beliefs." They were most stunned by the picture of the two princes kissing each other romantically. In April 2004, a child asking his father about an image of two men kissing prompted him to complain, "By [my son] finding that book and asking why two men were kissing in it, I had to tell him about the two men being gay, which is something we disagree with." Shelby County, Indiana's library vote disagreed with a formal complaint that said the parent was forced to explain "why two men were kissing", but did agree to move the book to a section for children eight to twelve.

In October 2006, also in Massachusetts, the anti-gay group Family Research Council (FRC) co-ordinated Liberty Sunday broadcast throughout the U.S., "aimed to show how the gay-rights movement is undermining religious freedom." The Economist noted, "examples [of gay-rights movements undermining religious freedom] are rather hard to come by […] so King & King was frequently mentioned," with Tony Perkins of the FRC explaining, "kids were treated to pictures of two princes kissing one another."

Conservative religious groups in the United Kingdom opposed the "No Outsiders" project, introduced in 2007, which included the book. Stephen Green, the leader of Christian Voice, described it as "tantamount to child abuse." Elizabeth Atkinson, the project's director, said, "These books are presenting one aspect of the spectrum of daily life...Many, many children in this country have this as part of their everyday experience."

In September 2007, "[A]ppalled by images of two princes standing together at an altar and later kissing," the Macungie, Pennsylvania supervisors were petitioned to pull the book from its library. The supervisors declined to overrule the library and the banning effort backfired when donations brought the book into more area libraries that did not have a copy.

== Sequel ==
King & King & Family (Tricycle Press, March 2004 ISBN 1-58246-113-9) is the sequel to King & King. It is a 32-page hardcover English-language book, at a recommended reading level for children ages 4–8. It was written and illustrated by Linda de Haan and Stern Nijland.

This second installment follows the newlywed kings on their honeymoon. The two explore a jungle, finding various animals that all have children; King Bertie expresses the wish that he and King Lee have a child of their own. When they return home, they find that a lonely orphan girl has stowed away in their suitcase. They adopt her, name her Daisy, and raise her as a princess.

== See also ==
- COLAGE
- GLSEN
- LGBT parenting
- LGBT nobility and royalty
- The Princes and the Treasure (2014)
- Prince & Knight (2018)
