= Aurelius Zoticus =

Lover of Roman emperor Elagabalus

- Occupation: Cubicularius
- Years active: c. 219 AD–221 AD
- Known for: Lover of the Roman emperor Elagabalus

Aurelius Zoticus (Greek: Αὐρήλιος Ζωτικός; active c. 219 – 221) was a cubicularius and famous male lover of the young Roman emperor Elagabalus.

His story is known in two versions, one told by Cassius Dio and one contained in the later Historia Augusta.

== Version of Dio ==
The contemporary historian Dio tells that Aurelius Zoticus was an athlete originally from Smyrna, the son of a cook, for which he had the nickname Mageiros ("cook"). In addition to having a beautiful body, Zotico was known for having large sexual organs; when the emperor's envoys, sent around for this purpose, learned of this fame, they had him accompanied to Rome with a gigantic escort.

In the capital he received the title of cubicularius, (attendant to the emperor's bedroom), obtained the honor of bearing the name Avitus (which belonged to Elagabalus' grandfather, Gaius Julius Avitus Alexianus), was adorned with garlands and brought to the imperial palace accompanied by many torches. Elagabalus opened the doors of the palace dancing and, when Zoticus greeted him calling him "Lord Emperor", Elagabalus replied: "Call me not Lord, for I am a Lady."

Elagabalus and Zoticus went to take a bath, where the emperor found out that the athlete lived up to his fame, and prepared for a night. However, Hierocles, a charioteer who had become the emperor's lover, had Zoticus served a drugged drink, fearing that he might supplant him in the favor of the emperor. Because of the drug, Zoticus was unable to satisfy his lover and, stripped of his honors, was exiled from Italy. According to Dio, this saved him from death that would soon meet the emperor's collaborators and allies.

== Version of Historia Augusta ==
Historia Augusta, probably written in the 4th century, reports a slightly different version, contained in the first half of the book Life of Antoninus Elagabalus, It is considered more likely.

According to this story, Zoticus was for a long time a close collaborator of Elagabalus, so much so that the members of the court considered him the emperor's consort; Zoticus exploited the intimacy granted to him by Elagabalus, revealing the views and intentions of the emperor concerning the interested party upon payment, thus accumulating considerable wealth. Upon coming out of an audience with the emperor, he would go to each interested party revealing to them what concerned them, but in reality his confidences, both threatening and promising, were false.

According to this version, Elagabalus married Zoticus as the athlete's bride, even having the woman who accompanied the bride in a Roman marriage, and consummated their union.
