= Maiden & Princess =

2019 picture book by Daniel Haack and Isabel Galupo

- First edition cover
- Author: Daniel Haack; Isabel Galupo
- Illustrator: Becca Human
- Language: English
- Genre: fairy tale picture book
- Publisher: Little Bee Books
- Publication date: April 2, 2019
- Publication place: United States
- Pages: 40
- ISBN: 978-1-4998-0776-9

Maiden & Princess is a 2019 picture book written in rhyming verse by Daniel Haack and Isabel Galupo and illustrated by Becca Human. The story, described in some press outlets as a lesbian fairy tale, concerns a maiden attending a ball centered on finding a wife for the prince; at the ball, the maiden instead falls in love with his sister, the princess.

The book is a companion to and shares a fictional world with Haack's earlier work, Prince & Knight (2018); both books were the product of a partnership between Bonnier Publishing USA and LGBTQ media organization GLAAD. Galupo and Haack sought to write an uncomplicated queer romance for children using recognizable fairy tale tropes. The work was launched on Lesbian Visibility Day and received positive reviews for its subversion of common fairy tale story beats and Human's artwork.

== Plot ==
A king and queen announce a royal ball to find a bride for their son, the prince. One maiden who knows the prince from battling alongside him is not excited to attend, but at the urging of her mother she goes nonetheless. Guests at the ball, including the king and queen, encourage the maiden to dance with the prince but she panics and steals away to a balcony to get some air.

The prince's sister encounters the maiden on the balcony and the two sit together and speak. As they are talking, the maiden takes the princess's hand, realizing she has fallen for her instead of her brother. The king and queen find the pair on the balcony and remark that they are well-suited for each other. After the maiden asks the princess to dance, they kiss. Later, the couple spends a great deal of time together and eventually get married and live happily ever after.

== Development and creation ==
=== Writing ===
In 2018, as part of a partnership between Bonnier Publishing USA and LGBTQ-rights advocacy group GLAAD, Bonnier subsidiary Little Bee Books released Prince & Knight, a fairy tale picture book about a prince and a male knight falling in love. Daniel Haack, the sole author of Prince & Knight coauthored Maiden & Princess with Isabel Galupo, a fellow alum of Ithaca College. The book serves as a companion to Prince & Knight and shares a fictional universe with the earlier work. The two authors set out to "take that fairy tale structure with real human characters and tell a simple love story between these two women, complete with all the anxieties and excitement of first love that would resonate with kids", according to Haack. He expressed excitement about penning a children's book centering on a female–female relationship, which Haack felt were underrepresented in children's literature relative to male–male relationships. Galupo, a queer woman, described feeling grateful that Haack reached out to her as someone "with lived experience relevant to the book's subject matter".

Galupo and Haack met several times to develop the story's plot before splitting up to write sections of the book individually. When they reconvened, they would read their passages aloud and edit the work as they moved through the story. Galupo appreciated having Haack to sound ideas off of and said that he helped her when she was at a loss in the writing process. According to Haack, the authors' collaboration was "easy and organic".

Haack and Galupo sought "to write an uncomplicated love story for queer people to aspire to", according to Galupo. Growing up with two mothers in an interracial relationship, Galupo never felt that she would not be accepted by others, and sought to have the story reflect her lived experience. The characters in Maiden & Princess do not contend with any bullying or homophobia, although the maiden deals with expectations of heteronormativity, such as the pressure to wear a dress to the royal ball. Haack and Galupo also considered whether or not to end the story with a marriage. They felt that some readers would not appreciate such a conclusion considering that "marriage is absolutely a product of our patriarchal society" according to Galupo, though ultimately the pair felt that ending with the marriage was the right way to tell their story.

=== Illustration ===
Becca Human illustrated Maiden & Princess. Galupo and Haack's only specification for Human's illustrations was that the title characters were to be in an interracial relationship. The authors discussed the implications of the races of the maiden and princess and settled on characterizing the princess and her family as people of color. Human illustrated the story with a variety of characters of diverse races and body types. After the authors decided that the maiden's and princess's astrological signs were Taurus and Leo, respectively, Human included depictions of the Taurus and Leo constellations in their illustrations on the book's endpapers.

== Publication ==
Maiden & Princess was published on April 2, 2019, and had its book launch on April 26 to coincide with Lesbian Visibility Day. The 40-page book, written in rhyming verse, was recommended for readers aged four to eight years. Proceeds from sales of the book were donated to "accelerate LGBTQ acceptance".

== Reception ==
Maiden & Princess received praise for its story's subversion of fairy tale tropes and its illustrations, with several news outlets describing the work as a lesbian fairy tale. A Publishers Weekly review said of the title characters' romance that "readers may expect resistance from the king and queen; refreshingly, though, the two wholeheartedly approve of the match" and concluded that "Galupo and Haack joyfully subvert fairy tale tropes while maintaining romance and enchantment." A review in Mashable described the story as using recognizable fairy tale story beats that child readers would be able to easily connect with and follow. Maggie Reagan's starred Booklist review referred to the work as an "openhearted fairy tale that gently affirms all kinds of love". Nell Beram, writing for The Horn Book Magazine, called the story's rhymes "indifferent to meter" in an otherwise positive review.

In School Library Journal, Elaine Fultz called Maiden & Princess an "earnest love story" and praised the "vibrant, colorful costumes, makeup, and hairstyles of the characters as well as the opulent castle ballrooms" as illustrated by Human. Publishers Weekly also described Human's "diverse villagers in lavish, jewel-toned gowns and dramatic headpieces" which they felt brought "a sense of opulence to the pages". Beram felt that Human's "sumptuous jewel-toned art" gave the story's setting "an enchanting aura".
