= Hierocles (charioteer) =

Favourite and lover of Roman Emperor Elagabalus (died 222)

- Born: Late 2nd century
- Died: 222 AD
- Occupation: Charioteer
- Known for: Being a lover of the Roman emperor Elagabalus

Hierocles (Greek: Ἱεροκλῆς, late 2nd century – 222 AD) was a favourite and lover of the Roman Emperor Elagabalus.

Most of the descriptions of his life are given by Cassius Dio and the Historia Augusta. Hierocles was from Caria in Anatolia, and was at some point enslaved, later becoming a charioteer in the service of Elagabalus. Initially, he was a lover and student of another charioteer named Gordius.

Elagabalus was said to have been captivated by the blond and youthful Hierocles when the athlete fell in front of him during a chariot race. The Emperor made him his lover and husband and, as a consequence, Hierocles was alleged to have gained significant political influence, allegedly having more power than the emperor himself.

Additionally, Hierocles' mother, a slave, was promoted to be equal among wives of ex-consuls. Hierocles is said to have drugged the athlete Aurelius Zoticus with a drug that "abated the other's manly prowess." After Zoticus was unable to secure an erection, Elagabalus had him exiled from Rome. This later saved the athlete's life as he was not executed with the members of the court in 222.

After Elagabalus granted Hierocles his freedom, he wanted Hierocles to be declared caesar, against the opposition of his grandmother, Julia Maesa. Allegedly, Elagabalus' partiality towards Hierocles, coupled with his eccentricities, such as delighting in being physically reprimanded by him, were the principal reasons he lost the support of the Praetorian Guard, which led to his death.

Elagabalus, when threatened with death by the Praetorian Guard, reported to have said, "Grant me this one man, whatever you may have been pleased to suspect about him, or else slay me," in regards to Hierocles. This postponed his assassination to 222 AD, after which Hierocles and many other members of the emperor's court, including Elagabalus's mother Julia Soaemias, were also killed.
