= Prince & Knight =

2018 children's picture book

- Author: Daniel Haack
- Illustrator: Stevie Lewis
- Language: English
- Genre: LGBTQ+ children's literature, picture book
- Publisher: Little Bee Books/GLAAD
- Publication date: May 1, 2018
- Publication place: United States
- Pages: 40
- ISBN: 9781499805529

Prince & Knight is a children's picture book authored by Daniel Haack and illustrated by Stevie Lewis. Prince & Knight tells the story of a young prince who falls in love with a knight after the two work together to battle a dragon threatening the kingdom. At the conclusion of the book, the two wed.

Prince & Knight was originally published by Little Bee Books in 2018, and is the inaugural effort of a partnership between Bonnier Publishing USA and media advocacy group the Gay & Lesbian Alliance Against Defamation (GLAAD). The partnership "is aimed at 'integrating and elevating positive LGBTQ representation in children’s literature.'" The book has also been published for Canadian and Japanese audiences with a companion book following its release.

The book has received both praise and opposition due to the nature of its content. While it has won various accolades, its use in educational settings has been challenged by social conservatives across the United States on the basis of appropriateness and morality given its intended audience.

== Plot ==
Once upon a time, a prince is in line to take his kingdom's throne, so his parents — the king and queen — decide he must first find a bride to help him rule. The three travel to nearby kingdoms to meet a variety of potential princess suitors, but the prince does not find what he is looking for in the princesses the trio meets.

While away, the prince receives news that a dragon is attacking his kingdom. The prince rushes back to battle the monster, and a knight arrives to assist. The two work together, the knight using his shield to blind the dragon, which allows the prince to successfully trap the beast. However, in doing so, the prince loses his balance and falls. The knight rushes in on horseback and catches the prince in his arms.

The two thank each other for saving their lives, and they fall in love. Their marriage is fully supported by the community, who cheer along at the couple's wedding, and by the prince's parents. The prince and the knight live happily ever after.

== Publication and background ==
Prince & Knight was first released in hardcover on May 1, 2018, as the lead title in a partnership between Bonnier Publishing USA and GLAAD. The launch received significant press attention, including from A Plus, the Chicago Tribune, Gay Times, NewNowNext, PinkNews, PopSugar, The TODAY Show, and TheWrap.

In interviews with GLAAD and HuffPost, Haack noted that he was inspired to write Prince & Knight after seeing a dearth of LGBTQ+ representation in children's media, especially those featuring human characters. In crafting the narrative, he specifically thought "it would be fun to play around with the Prince Charming and Knight in shining armor" archetypes and wanted to show kids that gay people "are just as capable of being the brave heroes, and are just as worthy as anyone of being in love."

GLAAD President and CEO Sarah Kate Ellis, commenting on the nature of the Bonnier Publishing/GLAAD partnership and importance of queer representation in literature, said, "[Books] are a natural progression to encourage awareness, kindness, and acceptance at an early age" and that "it’s so important that my two kids and others like them see their families reflected in the media."

In addition to the original hardcover copy, French (Le Prince Et Le Chevalier) and Japanese (王子と騎士) editions were published by Scholastic Canada and Oakla Publishing, respectively. A special paperback edition was released in 2019 by Scholastic Corporation for its in-school Scholastic Book Club, and a board book version was released in 2020.

A companion book, Maiden & Princess, co-authored by Haack and Isabel Galupo and illustrated by Becca Human, was released in April 2019. In this children’s book, a brave prince comes of age and a ball is held to find him a bride. A warrior girl attends but does not love the prince, instead falling in love with a girl she meets outside. This girl turns out to be the princess of the kingdom. Maiden & Princess features diverse characters and a message about staying true to oneself.

== Style and genre ==
According to Haack's personal website, the publication description characterizes Prince & Knight as "a children’s picture book" for ages 4–8 (Kirkus Review, 29) that combines text with full-page illustrations by Stevie Lewis.

As noted by Mombian founder Dana Rudoulph, Prince & Knight echoes the name and plot of King & King. Rudoulph argues that opposed to the "frenetic" and "off-kilter" illustrations in King & King, those of Prince & Knight, "have a charming, Disney-like quality to them." Additionally, Booklist, in a review of the piece, states the duo of Haack and Lewis have "constructed a colorful and entertaining tale exploring sexuality, acceptance, and young love."

== Reception ==
=== Awards and industry reviews ===
Prince & Knight has received positive industry reviews since its release. Kirkus Reviews gave it a starred review, calling it "victorious" and the "premier queer-friendly fairy tale for this age set." The School Library Journal said, "This is an illuminating fairy tale for young readers...A great addition to any library or classroom." Similarly, the Chicago Tribune wrote that "newcomer Daniel Haack has penned a much-needed LGBT fairy tale [that] hits just the right notes; it’s at once matter-of-fact and alive to the magic of true love." Bookish noted that "Haack has written a beautifully inclusive fairy tale made all the more special by Stevie Lewis’s magical illustrations."

Prince & Knight was named to the American Library Association's 2019 Rainbow List Top Ten. It was also a Goodreads Choice Award nominee for Best Picture Book and was named a best children's book of 2018 by Amazon, the Chicago Tribune, Kirkus Reviews, and PopSugar.

=== Censorship challenges ===
According to the American Library Association’s Office for Intellectual Freedom, Prince & Knight was the fifth most challenged book of 2019. Oft stated reasons for the book to be challenged include its LGBTQIA+ content; for being “a deliberate attempt to indoctrinate young children” with the potential to cause confusion, curiosity, and gender dysphoria; and for conflicting with a religious viewpoint.

Deborah Caldwell Stone, executive director of the Office for Intellectual Freedom, says, "Our concern [as an organization] is the fact that many of the books are age-appropriate and developmentally appropriate books intended for young people" but are challenged because "they allegedly advance a political agenda or sexualize children." According to findings from the ALA, the challenges came from parents, legislators, and religious leaders.

==== Controversy in Upshur County, West Virginia ====
The Upshur County Public Library in West Virginia removed Prince & Knight from its shelves after Josh Layfield, a Calvary Chapel Mountain Highlands pastor, met with library officials to voice his opposition to the book.

In a since-deleted Facebook post, Layfield said:

This book is a deliberate attempt to indoctrinate young children, especially boys, into the LGBTQA lifestyle. This book is deliberately appealing to their imagination, creativity, and their innocence… Children’s books, which are promoted by the state and put into circulation by taxpayer funds, should remain innocent. Unfortunately, this is an intentional leading of children into sin.

Layfield's comments and the decision to pull the book from library shelves prompted responses from local and national LGBTQ+ and censorship advocates. Sarah Kate Ellis, GLAAD President and CEO, said in a statement:

The decision to remove Prince & Knight from the shelves of the Upshur County Public Library is an act of discrimination, plain and simple ... inclusive children’s books do not "indoctrinate" but do allow LGBTQ families and their children the chance to see themselves reflected in the world.

Additionally, the National Coalition Against Censorship, the American Library Association Office for Intellectual Freedom, and West Virginia Library Association have all urged Upshur County to return the book to circulation. In a letter to board members, the WVLA stated:

One parent’s — or community member’s — belief that a book is inappropriate for their family should not be grounds for restricting that title when the book may be a treasured favorite for other children and families.

According to the New York Times and the ALA's field report, Prince & Knight "was temporarily removed from the library, but later returned."

==== Controversy in Loudoun County, Virginia ====
In Loudoun County, Virginia, the local school district faced several challenges to pieces of literature that were instated as a component of a "diverse classroom libraries" initiative for elementary and high school classrooms. Most challenges centered on the LGBTQ+ pieces of literature, despite constituting only five percent of designated texts for the program. Specifically, Heather Has Two Mommies, My Princess Boy, and Prince & Knight received the most requests for reconsideration by parents and citizens, according to internal district documents, with Prince & Knight having been moved to the school counseling office while under reconsideration.

Both those opposed and in support of the inclusion of the LGBTQ+ texts in the diversity initiative voiced their positions during a lengthy six-hour board of education meeting to discuss the controversy. Byron Cross, a physical education teacher in the district, said that all books that "could potentially confuse a child of who they are biologically [should be removed]." Another parent in attendance stated during the public comment, "I cannot stomach reading written porn, but my child can?"

The increase in media attention that resulted as the growing controversy grew prompted intervention by the National Coalition Against Censorship, who argued in an op-ed for the local newspaper:

All parents have the right to influence their own child’s education. Equally true: No parent has the right to dictate the education of all children based on their own personal beliefs.
