= Epagathus =

3rd century ancient Roman politician

Epagathus was an Ancient Roman politician of the early third century.

He was a profligate freedman, who along with Theocritus, a personage of the same class and stamp with himself, exercised unbounded influence over Caracalla, and was retained in the service of his successor. After the disastrous battle of Antioch in 218, he was despatched by Macrinus to place Diadumenianus under the protection of the Parthian king, Artabanus IV. At a subsequent period we find that the death of the celebrated Domitius Ulpianus was ascribed to his machinations, although the causes and circumstances of that event are involved in deep obscurity.

Alexander Severus, apprehensive lest some tumult should arise at Rome, were he openly to take vengeance on Epagathus, nominated him prefect of Egypt. But soon afterwards Severus recalled Epagathus from there and caused him to be conducted to Crete, and there Epagathus was quietly put to death.
