= Nonia Celsa =

Possible wife of Roman Emperor Macrinus

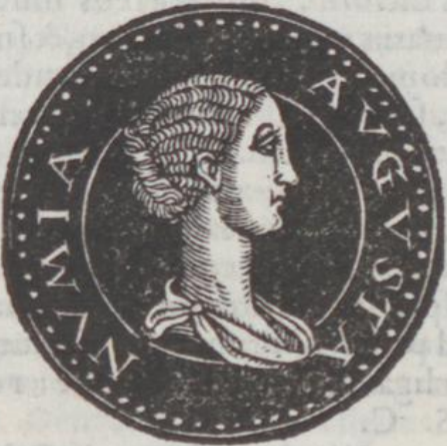
- 17th-century imaginary portrait

Roman empress
- Tenure: 217–218
- Spouse: Macrinus
- Issue: Diadumenian
- Father: Haius Diadumenianus (possibly)

Nonia Celsa is the name given by the Historia Augusta to the wife of Roman Emperor Macrinus (and presumed mother of his son and co-emperor Diadumenian), who ruled briefly in 217–218. The name is regarded as highly dubious by modern historians.

== Life ==
The only evidence of her existence is a happy letter allegedly written by Macrinus to his wife after he became Emperor. The first line is as follows: "Opellius Macrinus to his wife Nonia Celsa. The good fortune to which we have attained, my dear wife, is incalculable." The letter can be found in the biography of Diadumenian, part of a collection called Historia Augusta. Such "documents" are generally considered fabrications and the biographer(s) is also infamous for inventing people and names. Without further evidence even the existence of Nonia Celsa is highly dubious.

The Historia Augusta also claims that her son Diadumenian got his name from his maternal grandfather, which prompted Anthony R. Birley to identify her possible father as Haius Diadumenianus, the procurator of Macrinus' native Mauretania during the reign of Septimius Severus. If true it could imply that her name was actually Haia instead of Nonia.

== See also ==
- List of distinguished Roman women
- List of Roman and Byzantine empresses

== Sources ==
- Historia Augusta

Royal titles
Preceded by Julia Domna	Empress of Rome; 217–218	Succeeded by Julia Cornelia Paula
Preceded by Julia Domna	Empress-Mother of Rome; 217–218	Succeeded by Herennia Etruscilla
