= Liberalitas =

Personification of giving freely

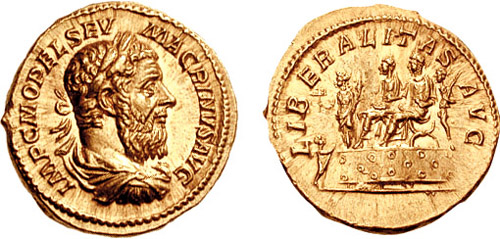
Aureus issued under Macrinus: he and his son Diadumenianus are depicted as providing for the people as Liberalitas embodied stands by (with the legend reading LIBERALITAS AUG[USTORUM])

In ancient Roman culture, liberalitas was the virtue of giving freely (from liber, "free"), hence generosity. On coins, a political leader of the Roman Republic or an emperor of the Imperial era might be depicted as displaying largess to the Roman people, with liberalitas embodied as a goddess at his side. The goddess Liberalitas appears on coinage issued under the emperors Gordian III Trajan, Antoninus Pius and Septimius Severus, sometimes designated as Augusta or Augusti in association with Imperial cult. On one example, a Roman holds out his toga to receive coins poured by Liberalitas, as Antoninus looks on from an elevated seat.

The divine Virtues are sometimes associated with a particular activity or function performed by the emperor—in the case of Liberalitas, the congiarium or giving of gifts by the emperor directly to individuals. The enacting of the particular virtue was considered an epiphany of the goddess or miraculum: Liberalitas was thought to have manifested herself when Trajan distributed cash gifts to the populace during his formal arrival ceremony (adventus) in 99 AD. Pliny the Younger names the quality of liberalitas in his Panegyric to Trajan.

Liberalitas was theologically linked to Providentia, "providence", and Annona, the embodiment of the grain supply.
