= Ulpius Julianus =

Roman general and censor (died 218)

Ulpius Julianus (died 218) was a Censor in 217, Princeps Peregrinorum, and a Praetorian prefect. He may have been loyal to the praetorian prefect Macrinus. Ulpius would have been Macrinus' praetorian prefect when he was sent by the emperor with a cavalry contingent of the third Legion to fight Elagabalus. The cavalry betrayed Macrinus and killed Julianus. Ulpius Julianus' head was presented to Macrinus at dinner.
