= Diadumenian =

Roman emperor in 218

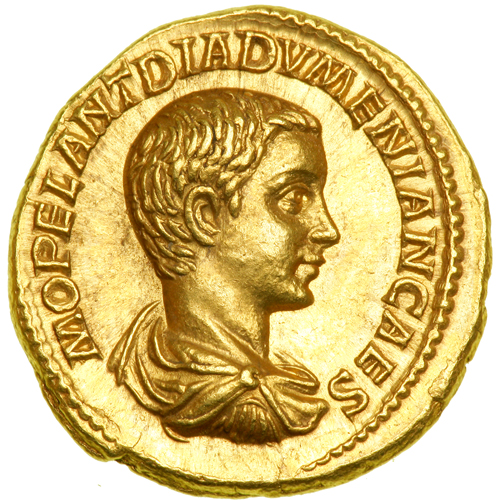
- An aureus bearing the image of Diadumenian. The inscription reads m opel ant diadvmenian caes.

Roman emperor
- Augustus: May – June 218
- Predecessor: Macrinus (co-emperor)
- Successor: Elagabalus
- Caesar: May 217 – May 218
- Born: 14 September 208
- Died: June 218 (aged 9); Zeugma
Names
- Marcus Opellius Diadumenianus (birth); Marcus Opellius Antoninus Diadumenianus (217)
Regnal name
- Imperator Caesar Marcus Opellius Antoninus Diadumenianus Augustus
- Father: Macrinus
- Mother: Nonia Celsa

Diadumenian (/daɪˌædʊˈmiːniən/ dy-AD-uu-MEE-nee-ən; Latin: Marcus Opellius Antoninus Diadumenianus; 14 September 208 – June 218) was the son of the Roman emperor Macrinus and served as his co-ruler for a brief time in 218. His mother, Macrinus's wife, is called Nonia Celsa in the unreliable Historia Augusta, though this name may have been fictional. Diadumenian became caesar in May 217, shortly after his father's accession to the imperial throne. Elagabalus, a relative of the recently deceased Caracalla, revolted in May of the following year, and Diadumenian was elevated to co-emperor. After Macrinus was defeated in the Battle of Antioch on 8 June 218, Diadumenian was sent to the court of Artabanus IV of Parthia to ensure his safety; however, he was captured and executed along the way. After his death and that of his father, the Senate declared both of them enemies of Rome and had their names struck from records and their images destroyed, a process known in modern scholarship as damnatio memoriae.

== History ==
Diadumenian was born on 14 September 208, named Marcus Opellius Diadumenianus, to Macrinus, the praetorian prefect and future emperor of Berber origin. The unreliable Historia Augusta, a collection of biographies of Roman emperors and usurpers, mistakenly names Diadumenian as "Diadumenus". The same source also states that Diadumenian's mother (Macrinus's wife) was called Nonia Celsa, though this name may have been invented by the author of the text. Little information survives about Diadumenian, although the details of his physical appearance can be deduced from coinage and a description from the Historia Augusta, which relates that he was "beautiful beyond all others, somewhat tall of stature, with golden hair, black eyes and an aquiline nose; his chin was wholly lovely in its molding, his mouth designed for a kiss, and he was by nature strong and by training graceful".

Having served as praetorian prefect under Caracalla, Macrinus participated in a plot to have the Emperor assassinated and exploited the resulting power vacuum to seize the throne for himself on 11 April 217, three days after Caracalla's death. Shortly after, the eight-year-old Diadumenian was elevated to caesar – formalising his position as heir to the throne – at Zeugma, while his guard was escorting him from Antioch to Mesopotamia to join his father. He was also given the name Antoninus, in honour of the Antonine dynasty, at this time. On 16 May 218 a revolt against him and his father was launched in Emesa by Elagabalus, whose mother, Julia Soaemias, was Caracalla's cousin. In order to put down the revolt, Macrinus led his legions to a fort at Apamea. There Macrinus elevated Diadumenian to augustus, making him co-emperor. After Macrinus was defeated by Elagabalus on 8 June 218, at the Battle of Antioch, Macrinus fled north and then to the Bosporus. Before fleeing, he entrusted Diadumenian to loyal servants, instructing them to take him into the Parthian Empire, to the court of Artabanus IV, to ensure his safety. Diadumenian was captured en route in Zeugma and executed in late June. His head was brought to Elagabalus and reportedly kept as a trophy.

Following the demise of both Macrinus and Diadumenian, the Roman Senate quickly proclaimed their support for Elagabalus, declaring the former emperors to be enemies of the state. They were subject to a process known in modern scholarship as damnatio memoriae, with their images and mentions in inscriptions and papyri being destroyed during the reign of Elagabalus. In an attempt to wipe out all traces of Diadumenian and his father, Elagabalus dated his own reign to the end of that of Caracalla. Surviving busts of Diadumenian are mangled, with the facial features barely being discernible.

== Numismatics ==
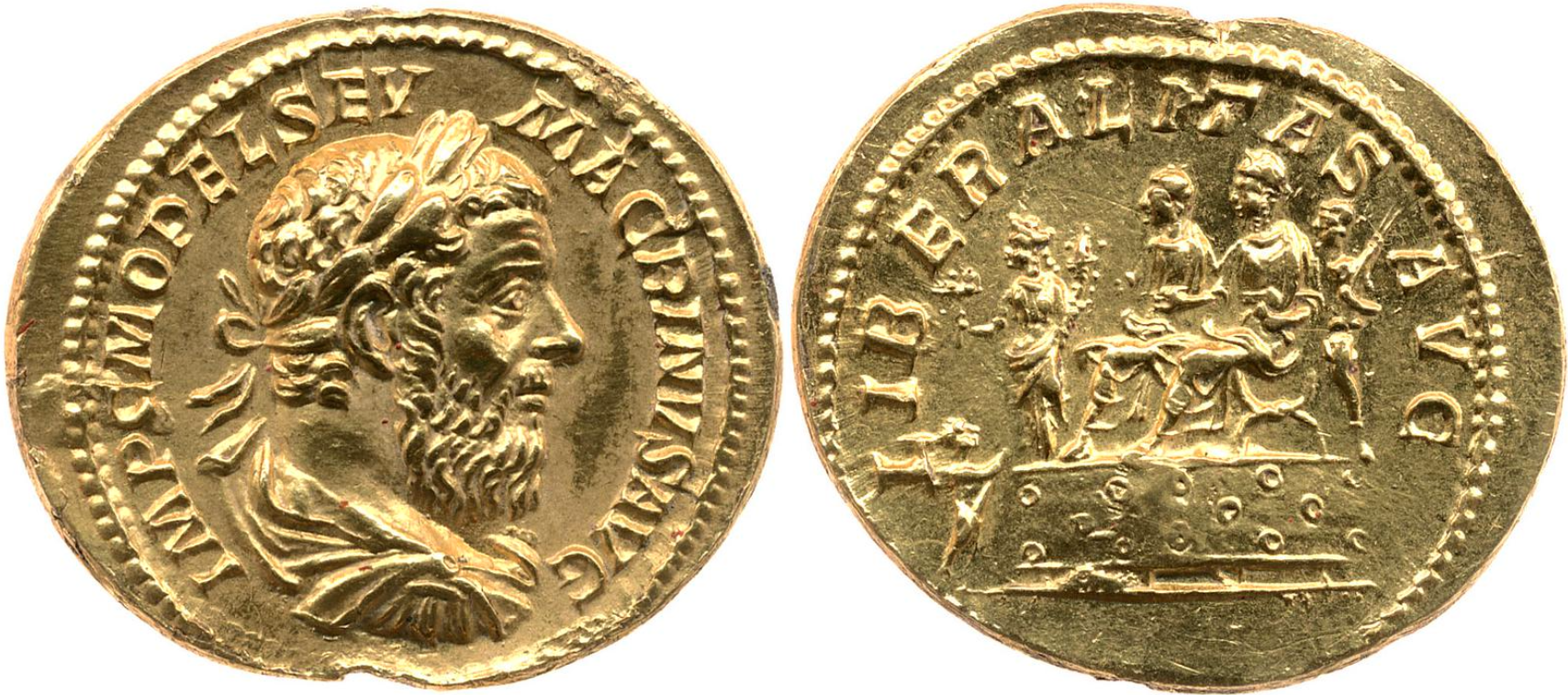
Aureus of Macrinus, which features Diadumenian on the reverse, seated on a platform alongside his father, with the allegory of Liberalitas before them.

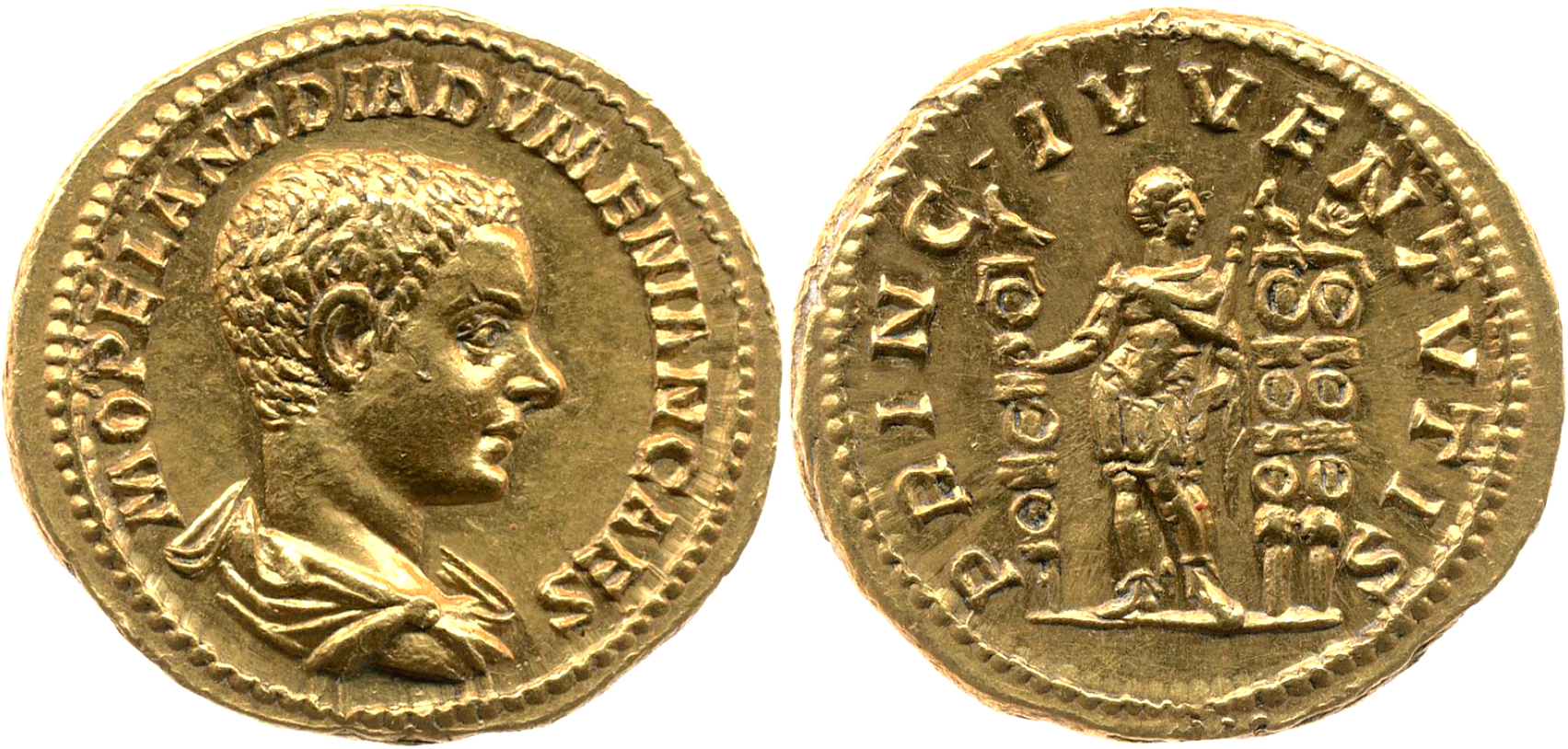
Aureus of Diadumenian. The reverse depicts him as princeps iuventutis (official heir) between military standards.

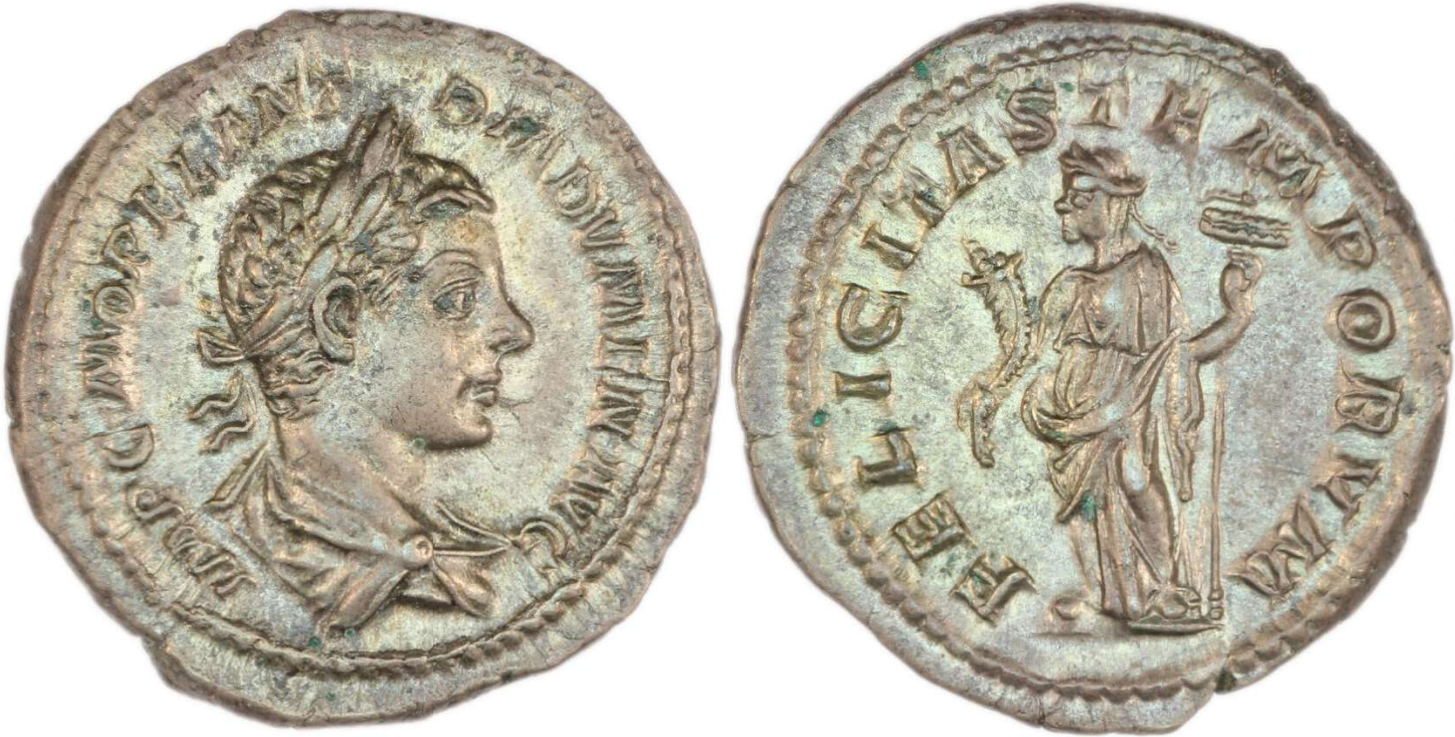
A very rare denarius of Diadumenian as augustus, minted in the last weeks of his life, between late April and early June 218.

A large number of coins were struck for Diadumenian as caesar, although fewer than those struck for his father. Coins in which he is depicted as augustus are extremely limited, and the only known coins from this time are denarii. This has led to the suggestion, first proposed by the ancient numismatist Curtis Clay, that a large issue of coins was being made for Diadumenian; however, they were quickly melted down when the news of Macrinus's defeat spread. Some eastern provincial coins from the period exist which give Diadumenian the title sebastos, at the time the Greek equivalent of the Roman augustus. In terms of gold coins, Diadumenian has one known style of aureus, bearing his image on the obverse and displaying Spes standing on the reverse, and one known style of half-aureus, bearing his image on the obverse and displaying himself holding a sceptre and standard.

Regnal titles
Preceded by Macrinus as sole emperor	Roman emperor 218; Served alongside: Macrinus	Succeeded by Elagabalus
