= Horti Spei Veteris =

Ancient Roman palace-estate

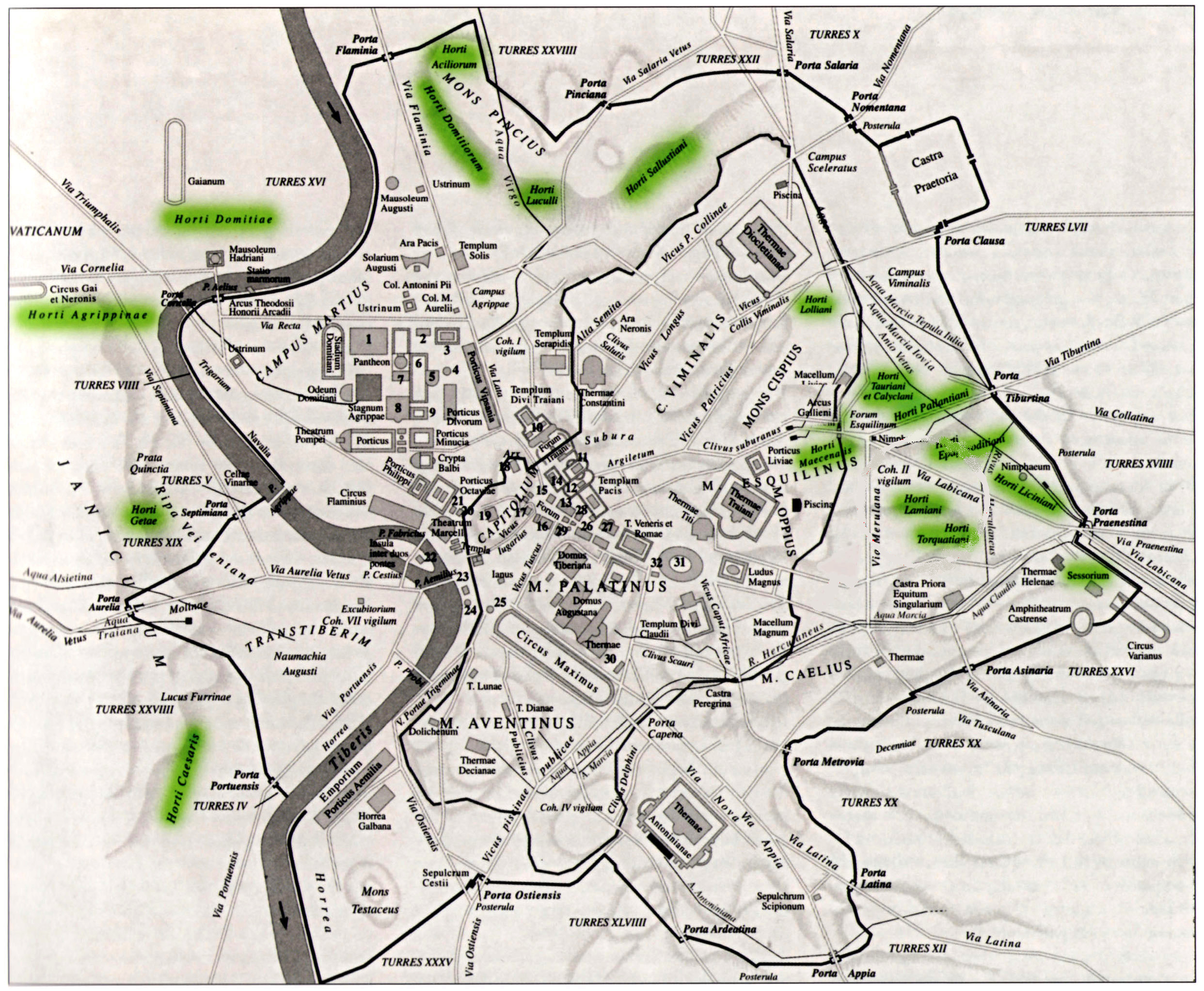
Horti of ancient Rome

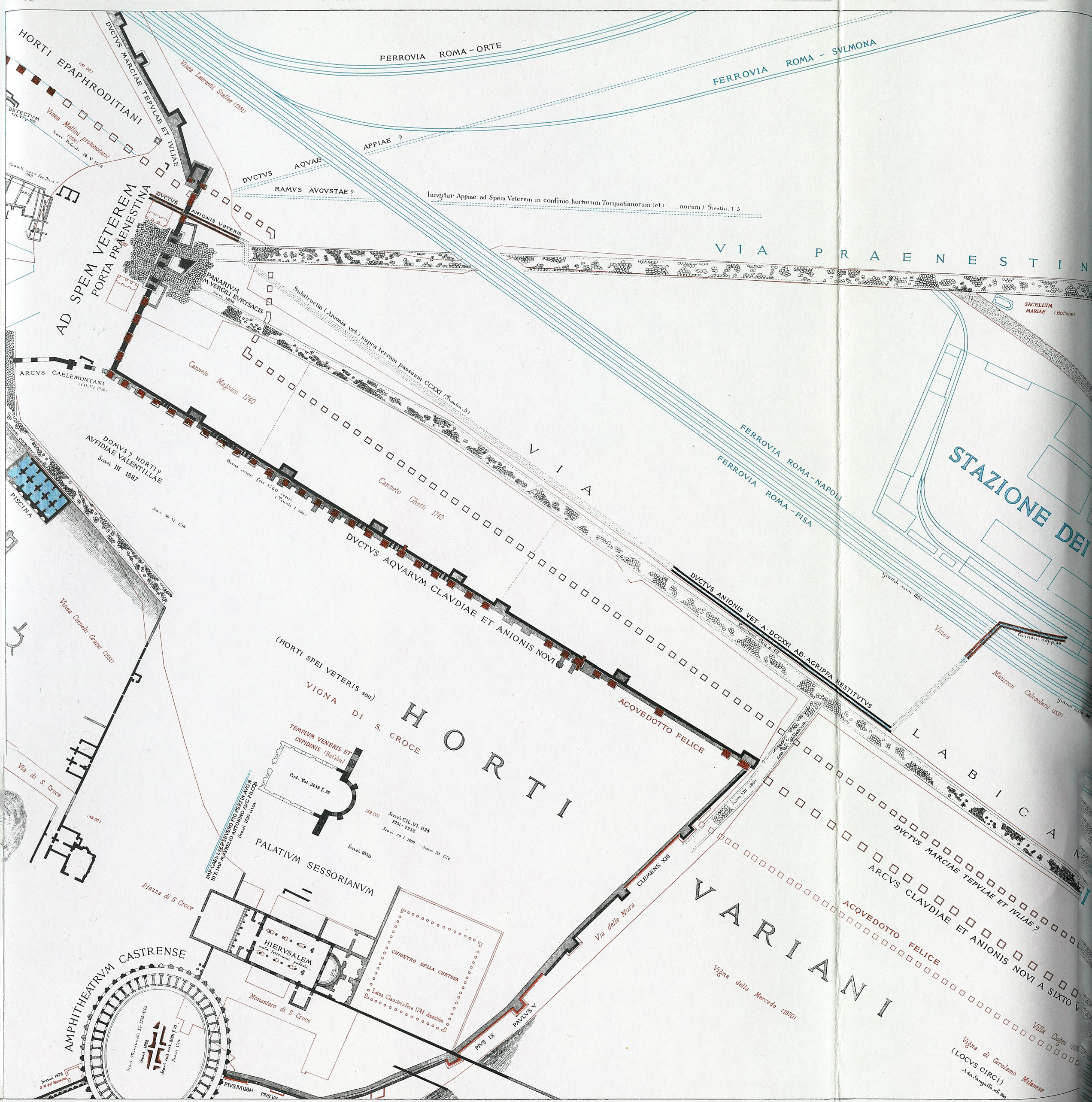
Plan of Horti Spei Veteris (Variani) (Lanciani 1901)

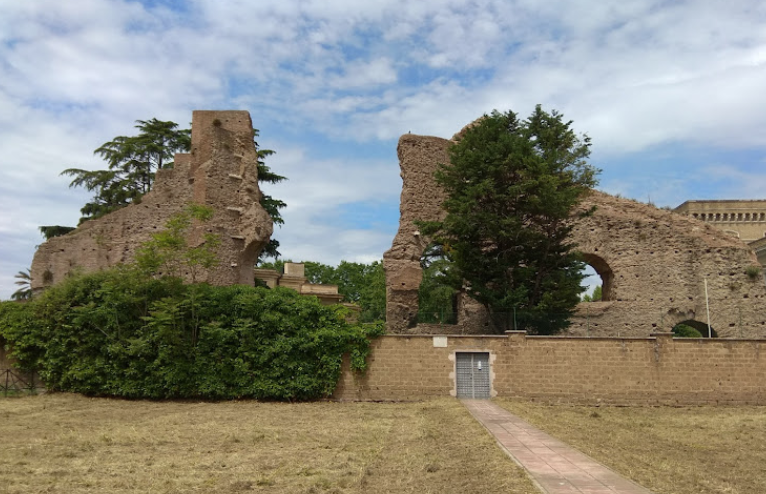
The apse of the Sessorium basilica

The Horti Spei Veteris, later called Horti Variani, was a luxurious and important palace-estate, eventually the residence of Emperors, on the Esquiline Hill at the south eastern corner of ancient Rome and covering an area of 12,000 m^{2}.

Remains are still visible today near the Porta Maggiore and the church of Santa Croce in Gerusalemme.

== Location ==
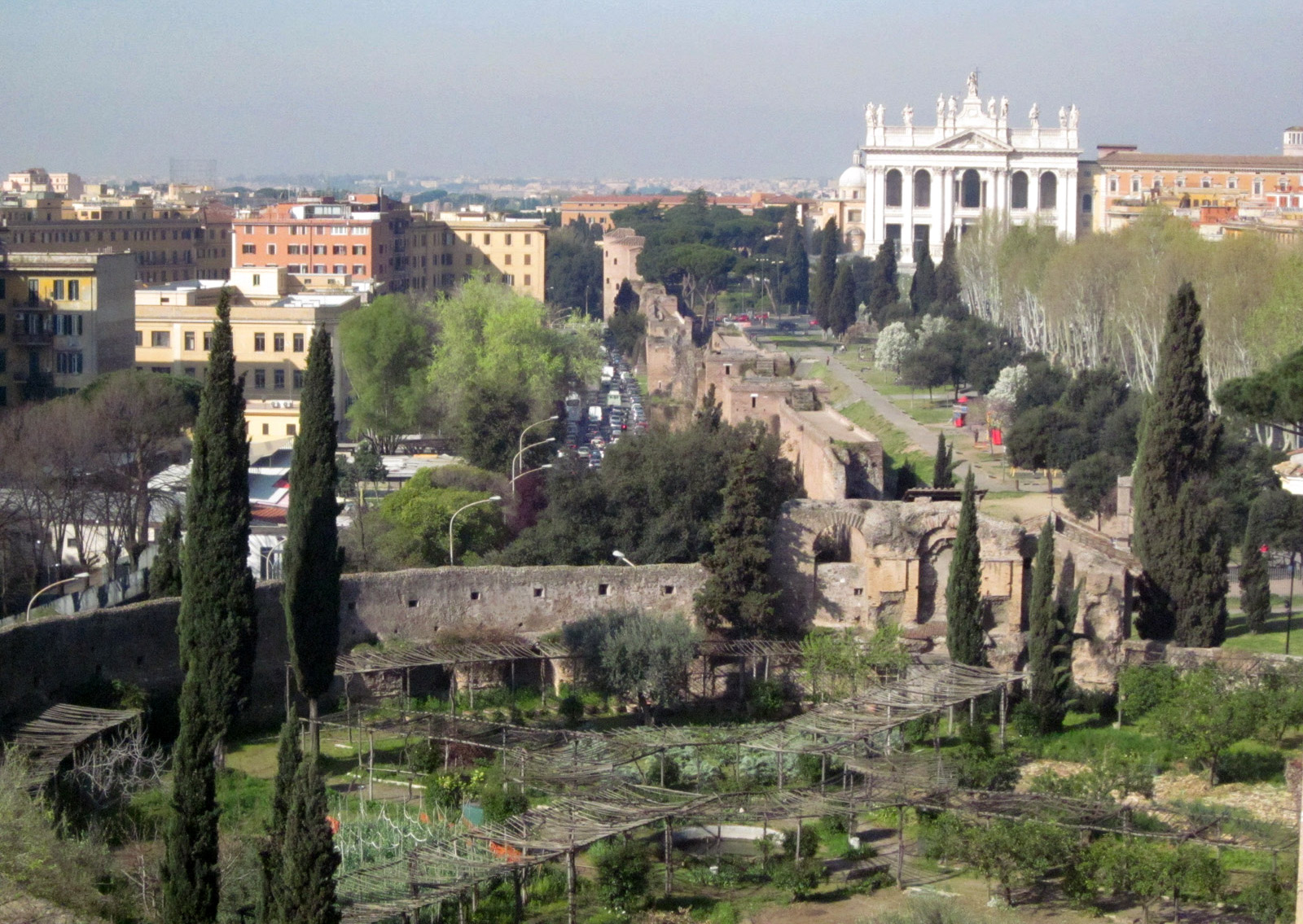
Amphitheater Castrense and Aurelian walls

The area near the Porta Prenestina (now Porta Maggiore) where the Via Labicana and the Via Prenestina branched off was called ad spem veterem. The name derives from a republican temple to the goddess Spes (Hope) built in 477 BC after the victory over Veii at the Battle of the Cremera. The "veterem" qualification was used to distinguish this temple from the one built in the 3rd century BC in the Forum Holitorium, at the time of the first Punic Wars.

The area was suburban but close to the Forum and well supplied with water by virtue of the fact that, by the middle of the 1st century BC, eight of Rome's eleven aqueducts converged there. At the same time, it became a prestigious residential area, accentuated as the city became more crowded and noisy.

== History ==
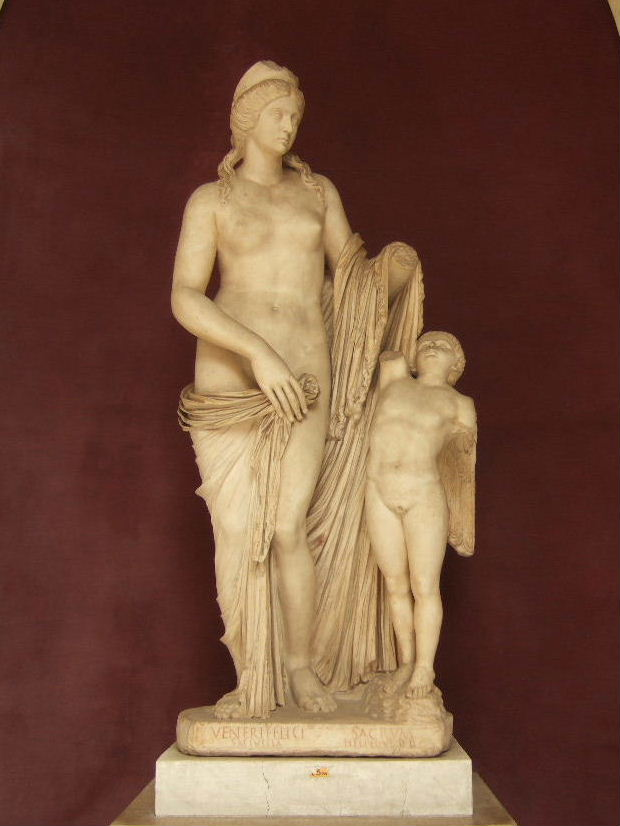
Venus and Cupid (Vatican Museum)

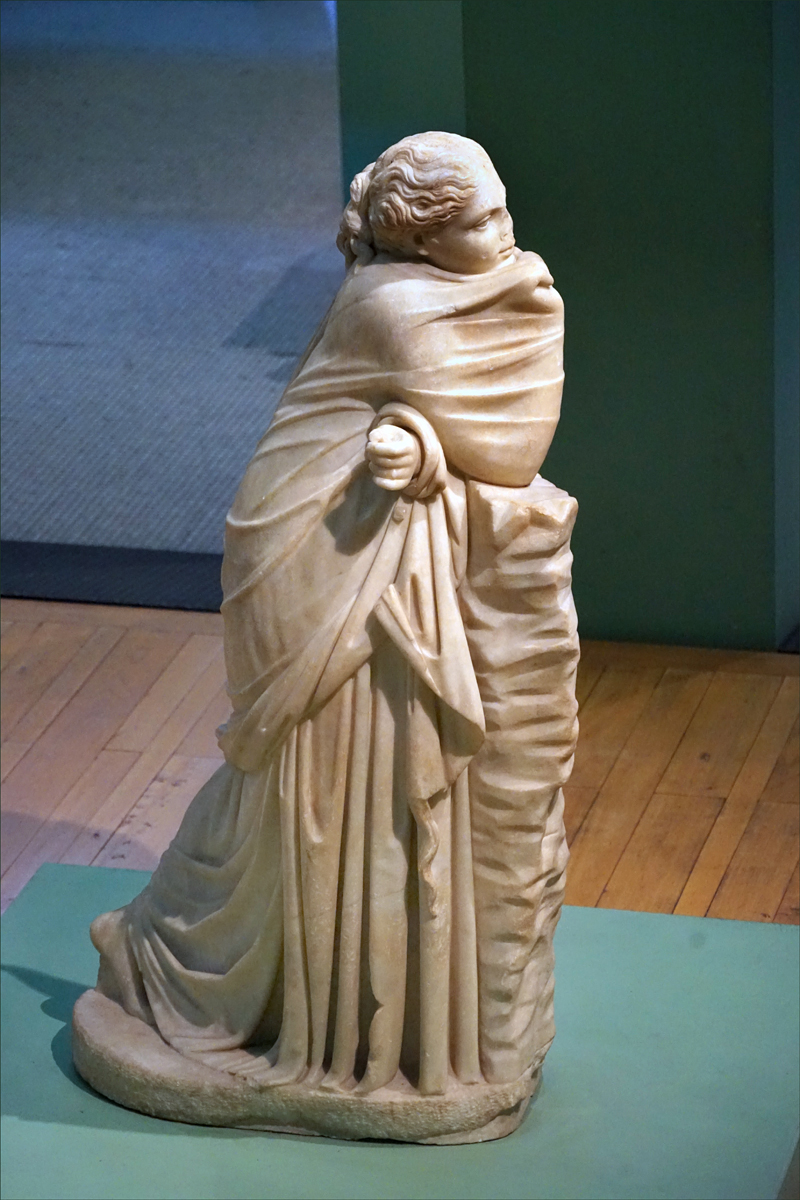
Muse (Polyhymnia?) found in an ancient underground passage in the Horti Variani, with the muse Melpomene. Very faithful Roman copy of original (2nd century BC) of Philiskos of Rhodes (Centrale Montemartini)

The Horti Spei Veteris were included in the imperial properties by Emperor Septimius Severus (r. 193–211), who built the first imperial residence in the area. Emperor Caracalla (r. 198–217) built the Circus Varianus there, and later emperor Elagabalus (r. 218–222) raced chariots under the family name of Varius. The subsequent name of Horti Variani is due to the inclusion of the nearby land belonging to Sextus Varius Marcellus, father of emperor Elagabalus, into imperial state property. Elagabalus made it his favourite retreat and designed it (as for Nero's Domus Aurea project) as a vast suburban villa divided into various building and landscape nuclei, modifying the circus (later replicated by Maxentius in his villa on the Appian Way) and building the Amphitheatrum Castrense. He also built the great atrium (later to become S. Croce) and a triumphal arch. The "public" part was already called the Sessorium in his time, as the sessions of the Council of State were held there.

Between 271 and 275, construction of the Aurelian Walls interrupted the Horti's vast continuity, cutting the Circus Varianus in two and incorporating the Amphitheatrum Castrense into the walls as a bastion.

Emperor Constantine the Great converted the Horti into his imperial seat from 306. When he decided to move his capital to Constantinople in Byzantium from 324 his mother, empress Helena Augusta, remained in Rome at the Horti to represent him. The beginning of the 4th century thus marked the last phase of expansion of the site in which it became an even more luxurious palace and the pole (also due to its proximity to the Lateran) of the Christian reorganisation of Rome. The expansion included the construction of the civil basilica intended for official functions (which was for a long time considered the Temple of Venus and Cupid due to the statue found there) and the transformation of a large rectangular atrium of the Horti Variani, an architectural hub that connected the living quarters with the circus and the amphitheatre and was originally covered by a flat ceiling, into a place of worship (later the basilica of Santa Croce in Gerusalemme), where she placed in 327 the relics she brought after her visit to Jerusalem and the eastern provinces including large parts of the "True Cross".

The residential rooms of the imperial family before the construction of the church were probably located in this area, given the discovery of sections of the corridor that connected them to the pulvinar (the royal box from which the emperor and the court watched the shows in the Circus). The name Palatium Sessorianum was most likely used for the complex from this time.

The existing nearby public baths, after being destroyed in a fire, were reconstructed between 323 and 326 (therefore renamed Thermae Helenianae). A residential area for members of the court (e.g., the so-called "Constantinian domus" excavated between 1996 and 2008) was created close to the aqueduct, and the part of the circus that remained inside the walls was restructured for service, connection, and perhaps residences for the servants of the imperial court.

After Helena died in 330 a slow phase of decline began during which, however, the palace was still the site of important public and religious events, such as the council convened in 433 by Pope Sixtus III in the presence of Valentinian III, the execution of Odoin in 500 commissioned by Theodoric and the Roman council held by Pope Symmachus in 510.

With the end of the empire, the area, which had become absolutely peripheral, went through centuries of depopulation; around the basilica-convent complex of Santa Croce, the ruins of the minor buildings ended up buried or overwhelmed by vineyards or uncultivated land, as can be seen in Bufalini 's plan of 1551.

== Excavations ==
Sporadic excavations have been carried out in parts of the horti starting in 1955 and continued to the present day.

Between 1996 and 2008, the so-called "Constantinian domus" was excavated.

== The Site ==
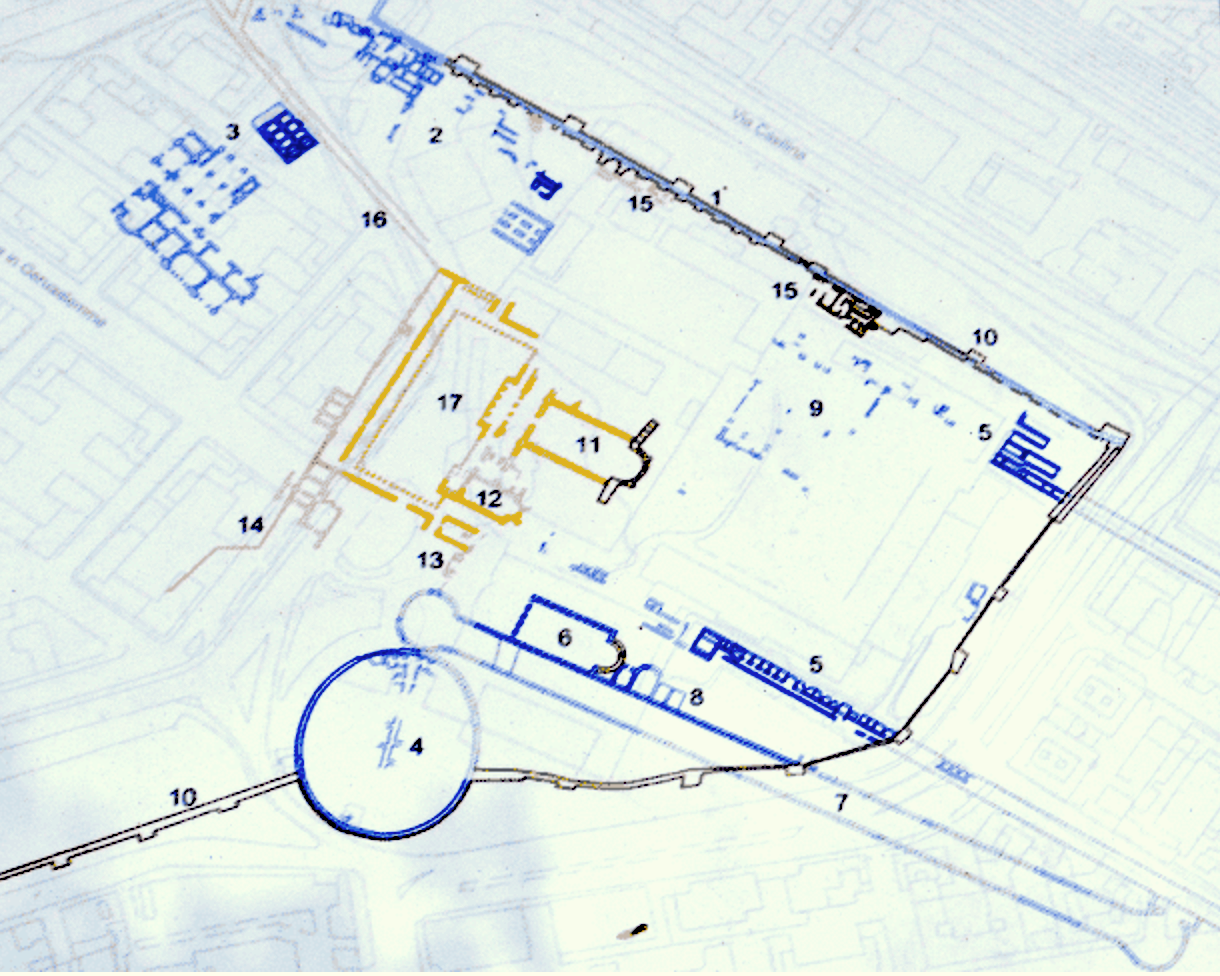
Plan Horti Spei Veteris 2: House of the mosaics 3:Baths, 5:circus basement 6:atrium 7:Pecile corridor 10:Aurelian walls 11:Sessorium 14:amphitheatre 15:domus Constantiana

The complex of the Horti Spei Veteris was developed under Elegabalus from a circus-palace association model for imperial and other luxurious palaces, completely integrated with the other buildings. This model was first created in the Horti Pompeiani and continued with the Domus Augustana linked to the Circus Maximus, used as a sumptuous scenic backdrop. The model was also used in other imperial palaces such as Hadrian's Villa, the villas of Domitian at Albano and Terracina, and the Villa of Maxentius.

=== Triumphal Portico (Porticus Triumphi) ===
A large circular building in opus testaceum came to light between 1995 and 1999, next to the Castrense Amphitheatre, connecting the rear part of the villa Sessorium with the Circus Varianus as part of a structure with a long covered driveway which flanked the large atrium. The building had monumental dimensions: the 1.8 m thick perimeter wall delimited a room with an external diameter of about 30 m and at least 16 m high, i.e., as high as the large driveway portico of which it constituted the western end. The fabric of the curtain walls of the circular building, the amphitheatre, and the atrium shows that they were conceived and built almost simultaneously, as part of a grandiose unitary project carried out by Elagabalus on the western elevation of the residence.

The large circular room represents the end of a porticus triumphi building, a very particular type of public building of late Republican origin converted here for private use. This type of building, of monumental dimensions, consists of a long portico divided in half by a central spine or colonnade into parallel passages and ending with two circular rooms. The sections found show a building about 14 m wide and 16 high, probably covered with a roof, in whose walls were doors and windows at irregular intervals, determined by the disposition of the adjacent buildings and the paths that led to it; at some points, the external elevation was enlivened by niches. The building is very similar, though longer at 369 m, to the Pecile of Hadrian's Villa and similar to that of the villa of Domitian at Terracina.

=== The Baths ===
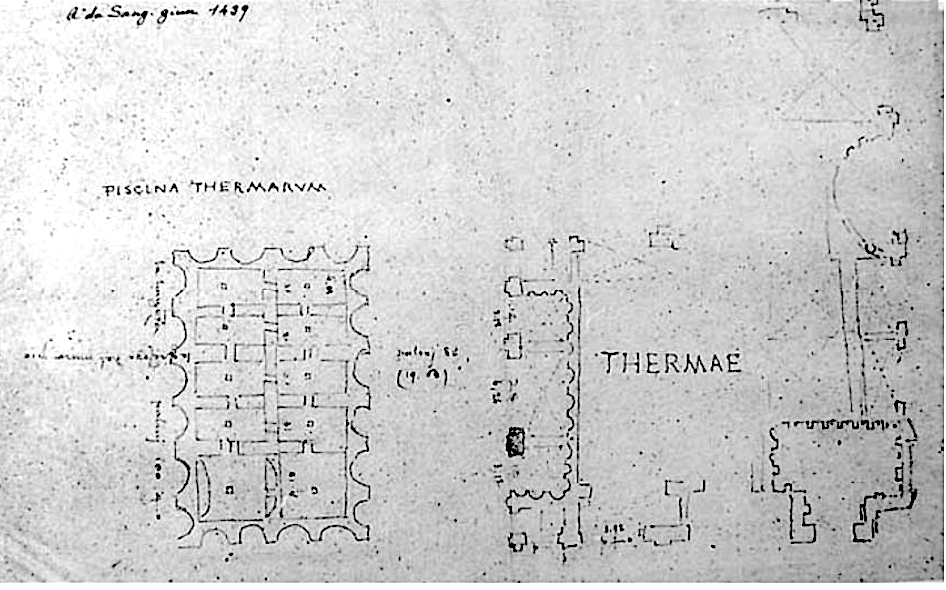
Thermae Helenianae and cistern (Antonio da Sangallo the Younger, 1439)

The thermal baths date from the Severan age, from brick stamps, confirmed by a dedication to Julia Domna, wife of Septimius Severus found here.

The plan of the complex has been handed down to us from the Renaissance drawings of Andrea Palladio and Giuliano da Sangallo, while the remains of the cistern that fed it are still visible at the crossroads between the modern via Eleniana and via G. Sommeiller, made up of twelve chambers arranged in two parallel rows. In the Middle Ages, one of these rooms was turned into a Christian chapel, of which fragments of frescoes were still preserved in the eighteenth century.

The remains of the baths were demolished at the end of the 16th century by Domenico Fontana at the behest of Pope Sixtus V in order to allow the opening of the section of the road in front of the basilica of Santa Croce in Gerusalemme.

=== Domus ===
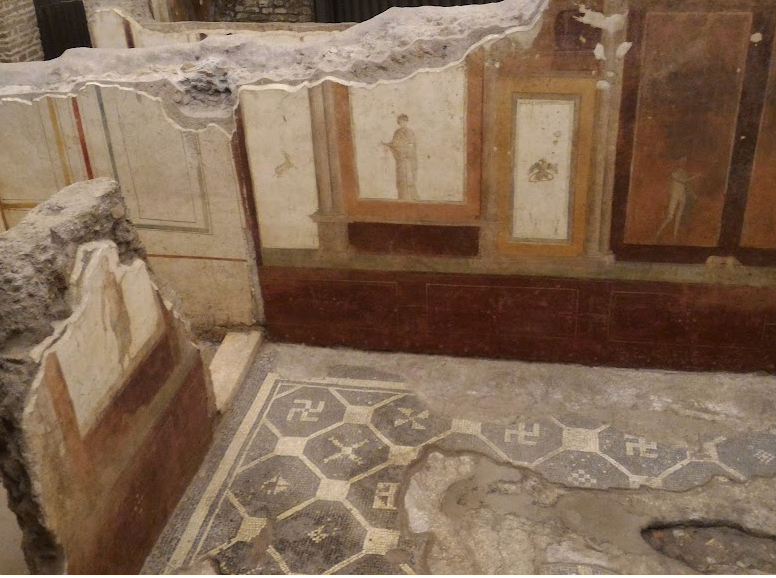
Domus of Aufidia Cornelia

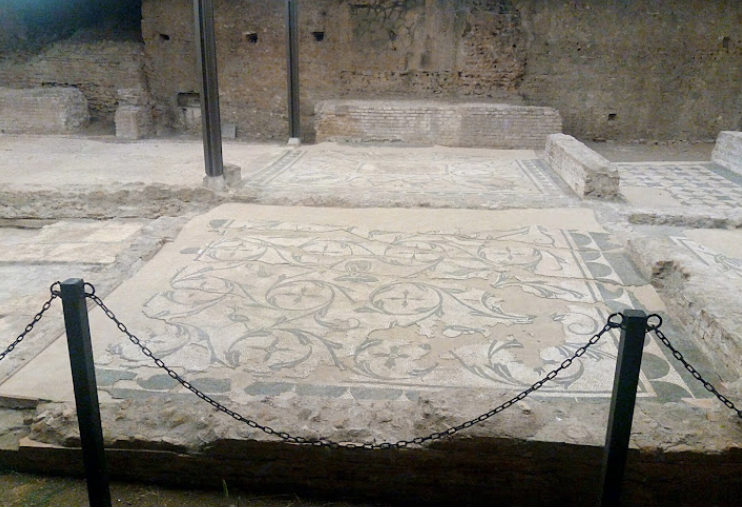
Domus constantinian

Four elaborate domus have been identified on the site close to the aqueduct and probably intended for members of the court:

- the House of mosaics
- the Domus of Aufidia Cornelia
- the Domus dei Ritratti
- the Domus della Fontana
