= La Bibbia Giorno e Notte =

La Bibbia Giorno e Notte (The Bible Day and Night) is an Italian television broadcast starting on 5 October 2008 in which the full text of The Bible was read and transmitted by RAI TV non-stop for nearly six days (139 hours). The reading was opened by Pope Benedict at 19:10, who read the first chapter of Genesis, followed by a cast of 1452 readers, including Hebraic and Islamic representatives. Readers ranged from a simple Italian family, a child, and a blind man, to ex-presidents of the Italian Republic, the Italian ex-prime minister Giulio Andreotti, and show-business celebrities such as Roberto Benigni. The reading was closed by Card. Tarcisio Bertone.

== Details ==
The event took place in Basilica di Santa Croce in Gerusalemme in Rome. The first and the last hour (13:17:11 October 2008) was transmitted by Rai Uno and Eurovision. The full transmission was seen via satellite on Rai Edu2 Channel (SKY chan 806) or online.

The broadcast received a special prize at the 2009 Premio Regia Televisiva awards.
