= Ludovico Valenti =

Italian Cardinal and Bishop

Cardinal Ludovico Valenti
- Cardinal-Priest
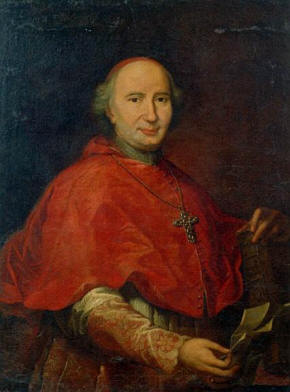
- Ludovico Valenti
- Church: Santa Croce in Gerusalemme
- Diocese: Rimini
- Elected: 24 September 1759
- In office: 18 October 1763

Orders
- Consecration: by Pope Clement XIII
- Created cardinal: 24 September 1759 by Pope Clement XIII

Personal details
- Born: 27 April 1695 Trevi, Diocese of Spoleto IT
- Died: 18 October 1763 (aged 68) Rome IT
- Buried: Santa Croce in Gerusalemme

Ludovico Valenti (27 April 1695 in Trevi, Umbria – 18 October 1763 in Rome) was an Italian nobleman, ecclesiastical lawyer, papal bureaucrat, Cardinal, and Bishop of Rimini.

== Family and Youth ==
Ludovico was the son of Alessandro Valenti and Paolina Venturelli. He had two siblings, Gaetano and Gaetana. His uncle Ferdinando was a Consistorial Advocate (lawyer practicing in the ecclesiastical courts of the Roman Curia). A distant relative was Cardinal Erminio Valenti (1564-1618), Bishop of Faenza, who had also had a career as an ecclesiastical lawyer. Benedetto Valenti was a scholar and canon lawyer under popes Clement VII and Paul III.

== Legal career ==
He pursued legal studies at the University of Rome, La Sapienza, obtaining a doctorate in utroque iure on 20 March 1719. He began a career as a lawyer by serving as a coadjutor (assistant) to his uncle Ferdinando, the Consistorial Advocate.

At the Conclave of 31 March-8 May 1721, he was appointed Commissary by the Cardinal Camerlengo, Annibale Albani. The assignment proved to be more onerous that usual, due to the length of the Conclave.

Pope Benedict XIII (1724-1730) named Ludovico a fiscal advocate of the Apostolic Camera. He was also a voting member of the Tribunal of the Segnatura of Grace.

On 31 March 1737, he was ordained a priest.

On 22 November 1737, he was named Rector of the Sapienza. He held the position until August 1741.

By 1742, Valenti was consultor of the Sacred Congregation of Rites. He was also Vicar of Santa Maria in Trastevere.

In 1742, as Referendary of both the Segnatura and Promoter of the Faith, he was charged by Benedict XIV with the exhumation of the body of Camillo de Lellis.

In 1747, he was dispatched to Malta as papal legate of Pope Benedict XIV to award the sword and hat to Manuel Pinto da Fonseca, Prince and Grand Master of the Sovereign Military Order of Malta. It is noted that Valenti was Chamberlain of Honor.

In 1748, as Refendary of both signatures, he presided at the exhumation and formal identification of the body of Joseph of Cupertino. In 1752, he was Promoter of the Faith in the process for the Canonization of Joseph of Cupertino.

Monsignor Ludovico Valenti was assessor at the Holy Office, Protonotario Apostolico sopranumerario non partecipante, and a member of the Reverend Fabric of S. Peter's (by 1754).

== Cardinal ==
He was created a cardinal priest in the consistory of 24 September 1759 by Pope Clement XIII. He was granted the titulus of Santa Susanna on 19 November 1759. On 20 December 1762 he opted for the titulus of Santa Croce in Gerusalemme. On the same day as he was created Cardinal, Valenti was named Bishop of Rimini. He was consecrated bishop on 14 October by Pope Clement XIII himself, assisted by Cardinal Camillo Paolucci (Merlini) and Cardinal Carlo Alberto Guidobono Cavalchini

Also on 24 September 1759, he was named Abbot Commendatory of the Camaldolese Abbey of St. Benedict of Savignano.

Cardinal Ludovico Valenti made his solemn entry into his diocese of Rimini on 25 May 1760.

As a Cardinal, Ludovico Valenti was a member of the Sacred Congregations: of the Council, of the Examination of Bishops, of Regulars, of Rites, Indulgences and Relics.

The Cardinal died in Rome on 18 October 1763, the Feast of S. Luca, after a long illness culminating in a wasting fever. His body was buried in his titular church, S. Croce in Gerusalemme; his praecordia were buried in S. Andrea delle Frate.

== Books ==
- Giuseppe Moroni (ed.), "Valenti, Lodovico," Dizionario di erudizione storico-ecclesiastica Vol. LXXXVII (Venezia: Tipografia Emiliana 1858), pp. 244–246.
