= Circus Varianus =

Ancient Roman circus in Rome

Coordinates: 41.8878°N 12.5194°E

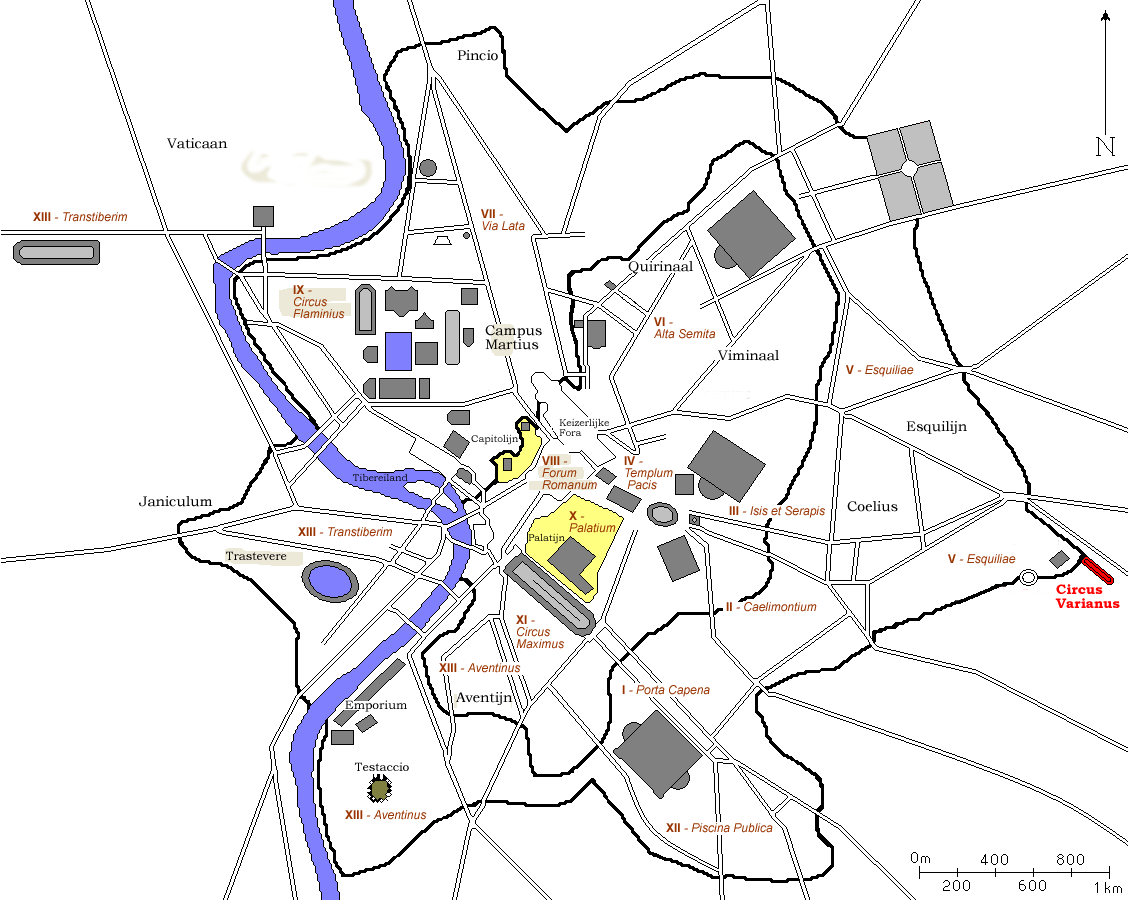
Location of the Circus Varianus in Ancient Rome

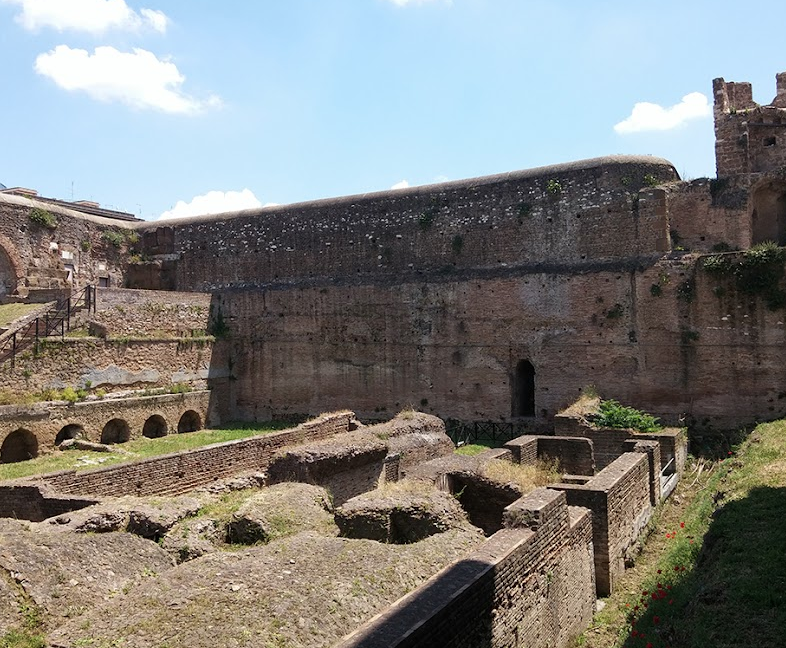
Circus Varianus foundations

Circus Varianus was a large Roman circus, started during the reign of Caracalla (r. 198–217) and located in the palatial villa complex known as the Horti Spei Veteris (later the Sessorium), which included the Amphitheatrum Castrense. This circus was where Elagabalus (r. 218–222) raced chariots under the family name of Varius, giving the site its name. The circus was later restructured by Elagabalus, who removed the western end to create more space for the palace by moving the starting gates (carcares) back and building two towers at the end.

Remains of the circus survive to the south of Porta Maggiore, next to the Aurelian Walls, near the church of Santa Croce in Gerusalemme. The dimensions of the circus were 565 x 125 m, only slightly smaller than the Circus Maximus (600 x 150 m).

In around 271 AD the circus was cut in two by the Aurelian Walls and the major part then lay outside the city walls so became unused.

According to records in the 16th century, an obelisk was found at the site, measuring 9.25 meters tall. It had originally been located at the temple dedicated to Antinous at Antinoöpolis and was moved in the reign of Elagabalus. After being discovered, the obelisk was moved to the Palazzo Barberini in 1633, from there to the Vatican in 1769, and reached Monte Pincio in 1822 where it resides currently.

== See also ==
- List of ancient monuments in Rome
