= Amphitheatrum Castrense =

Ancient Roman amphitheater in Rome

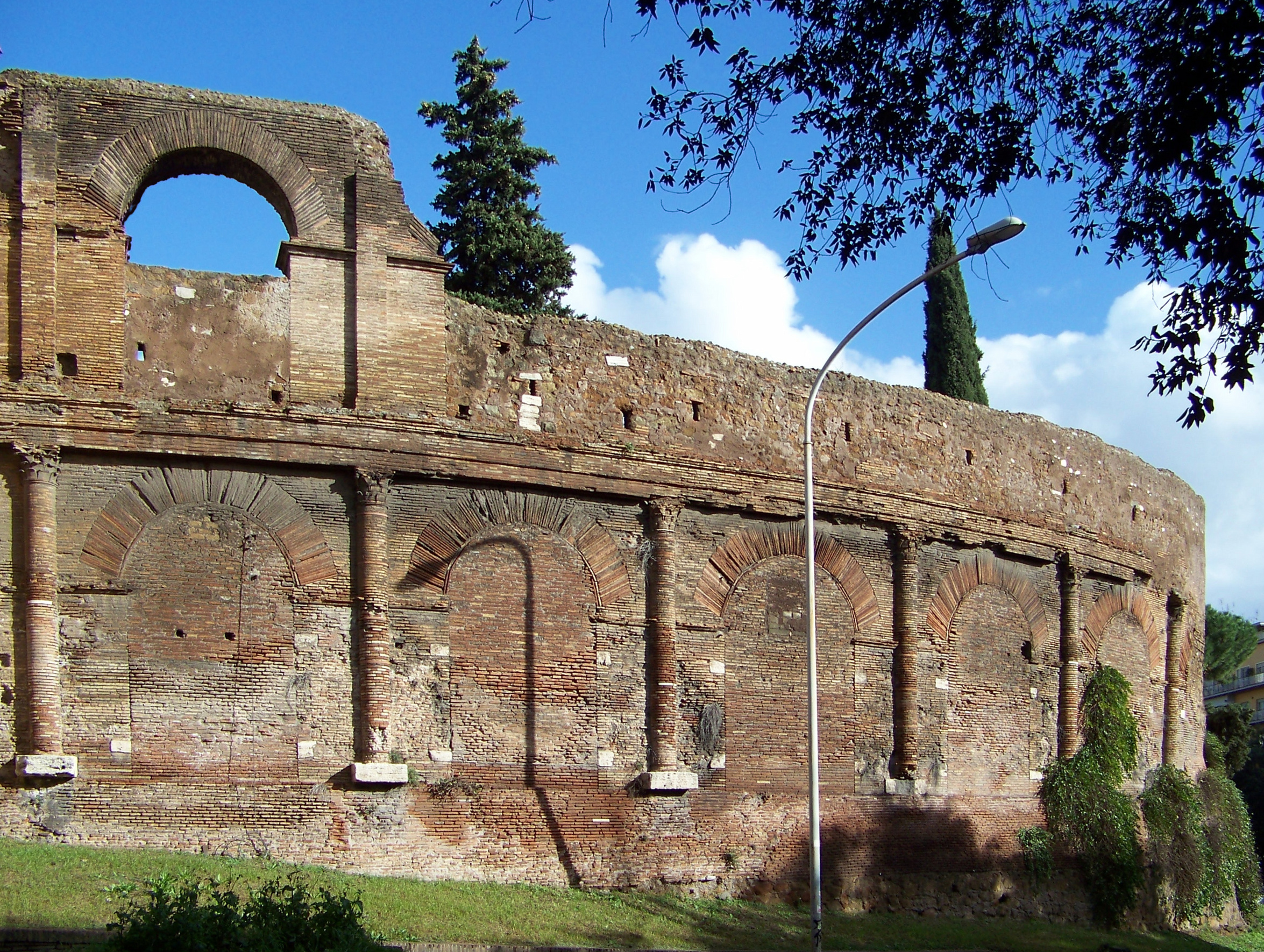
- The Amphitheatrum Castrense

- Shown in ancient Rome
- Click on the map for a fullscreen view
- 41°53′15″N 12°30′54″E
- Location: Rome

Site notes
- Material: Wood

The Amphitheatrum Castrense is a Roman amphitheatre in Rome, next to the church of Santa Croce in Gerusalemme. Both the Amphiteatrum and the Circus Varianus were part of the palatial villa known as the Horti Spei Veteris and later the Palatium Sessorium. The Regionary Catalogues name it as the "Amphitheatrum Castrense", which could mean it was an amphitheatre connected to an imperial residence.

== History ==
The amphitheatre was built by Emperor Elagabalus (r. 218–222) in the early decades of the 3rd century AD, as dated by the style of the bricks and the absence of brick stamps. It formed part of the Horti Spei Veteris, the imperial villa complex developed by emperors of the Severan dynasty.

The open arches of the outer walls were bricked up when the building was incorporated into the Aurelian Walls (271–275 AD). At that point, it ceased to be used for spectacles and was instead repurposed as a fortification, with the ground level around the structure being lowered accordingly. In the mid-16th century, the remains of the second story were demolished for defensive purposes. In the 18th century, a hypogeum was discovered beneath the arena, filled with the bones of large animals, leading researchers to believe that the spectacles held there included venationes—the hunting and killing of wild beasts. The ruins were also documented in drawings by Andrea Palladio and Étienne Dupérac.

== Construction ==
The building is a regular ellipse of 88 x 76 m constructed of brick-faced concrete, with a few decorative elements in travertine. It was three stories high, but only a section of the lowest story is preserved.

== See also ==
- List of Roman amphitheatres
