= Santa Croce in Gerusalemme =

Roman Catholic basilica and landmark in Rome, Italy

Basilica of the Holy Cross in Jerusalem
- Basilica di Santa Croce in Gerusalemme; Basilica Sanctae Crucis in Hierusalem
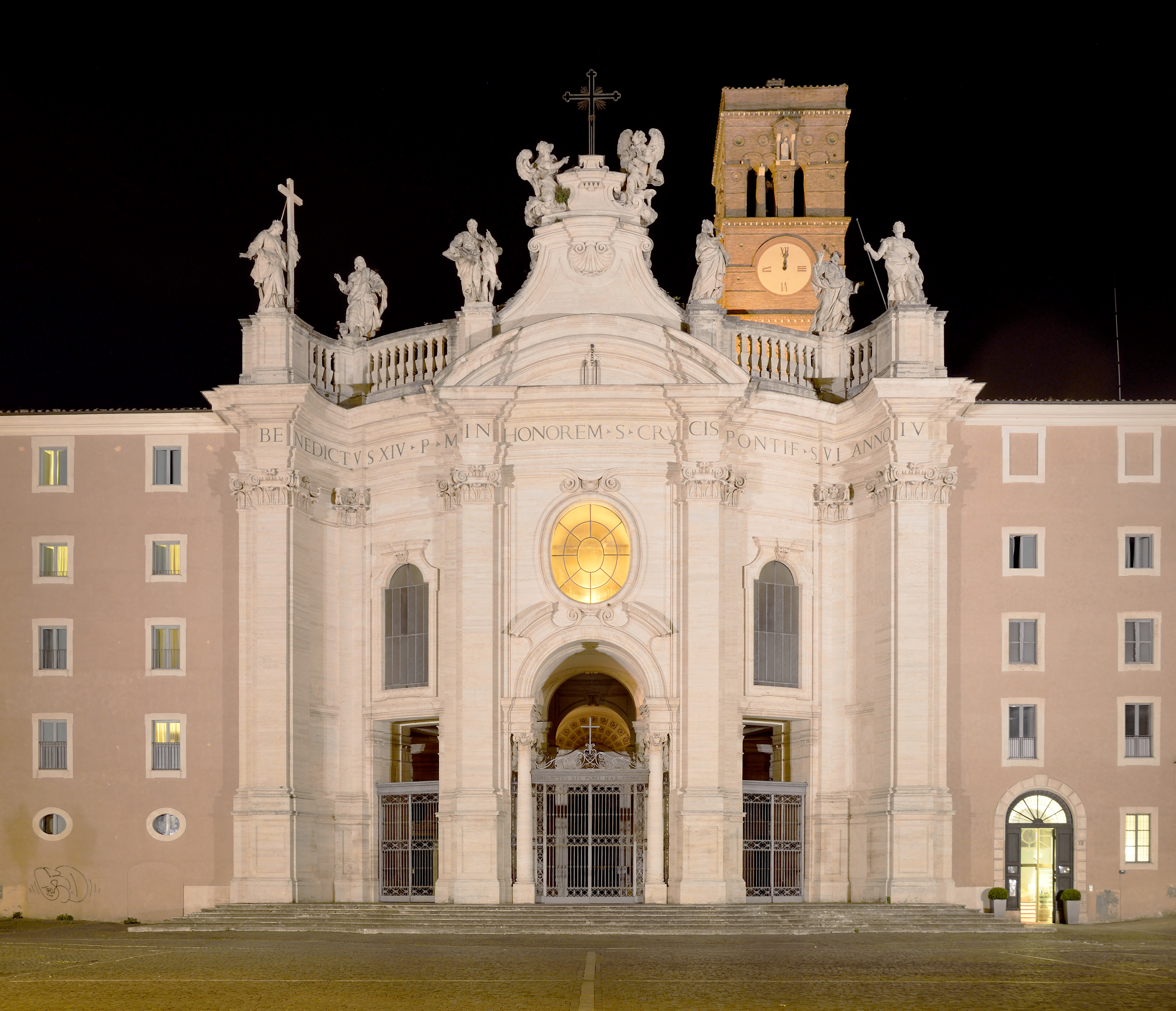
- Click on the map for a fullscreen view
- 41°53′16″N 12°30′59″E
- Location: Piazza di S. Croce in Gerusalemme, Rome, Italy
- Language: Italian
- Denomination: Catholic Church
- Tradition: Latin Church
- Religious order: Cistercians (1561–2011)
- Website: santacroceroma.it

History
- Status: Minor basilica, titular church: The Titulus Crucis; A Holy Nail; Two Holy Thorns; Finger of Thomas the Apostle; Ven. Antonietta Meo
- Dedication: True Cross
- Consecrated: c. 325

Architecture
- Architectural type: Church
- Style: Baroque

Specifications
- Length: 70 metres (230 ft)
- Width: 37 metres (121 ft)

Administration
- Diocese: Rome

Santa Croce in Gerusalemme (English: Basilica of the Holy Cross in Jerusalem, Latin: Basilica Sanctae Crucis in Hierusalem) is a Catholic minor basilica and titular church in R. XV Esquilino, Rome, Italy. It is one of the Seven Pilgrim Churches of Rome.

According to Christian tradition, the basilica was consecrated c. 325 to house the relics of the Passion of Jesus Christ brought to Rome from the Holy Land by Empress Helena, mother of Roman Emperor Constantine I. The basilica's floor was supposed to be covered with a handful of soil from Jerusalem, thus acquiring the title in Hierusalem; it is not dedicated to the Holy Cross of Jerusalem, but is considered in a sense to be in Jerusalem (much in the way that an embassy is considered extraterritorial). Between 1561 and 2011 it was the conventual church of an adjacent and now dissolved abbey of Cistercian monks whose aesthetic simplicity greatly influenced the basilica's interior. The church is now run directly by the Diocese of Rome. The current cardinal priest of the church is Juan José Omella.

== History ==
The basilica is built on the foundations of an imperial villa called Horti Variani ad Spem Veterem which was begun by the Emperor Septimius Severus and finished by the Emperor Elagabalus in the third century. The site included the Amphitheatrum Castrense, the Circus Varianus and the Eleniane Baths (so called after the restoration carried out by the Empress Helena). It contained a residential nucleus in which there was a large hall (later forming the basis for the basilica) and an apsed hall.

The villa was deprived of some of its material when the Aurelian Walls were constructed in 272. At the beginning of the fourth century the palace was chosen as a residence by Helena, mother of Constantine, with the name Sessorium (Italian: Palazzo Sessoriano). The name Sessorium comes from the Latin sedeo, or siedo, since in the late imperial era the imperial council used to meet in the aula regia, a reception hall (or throne room) of the palace. It was on Helena's initiative that the large rectangular hall was transformed into a Christian basilica around 320, originally covered by a flat ceiling, illuminated by twenty windows placed five on each side and with valuable marble decoration in the lower register. Helena had some soil from Calvary dispersed. The Sessorium's larger civil hall, built in the style of a three-aisled columned basilica, is still partially preserved as a free-standing apse ruin.

The basilica was declared a titular church by Pope Gregory I in 523. Despite the fact it was located on the outskirts of Rome, it became a destination of regular pilgrimage, thanks to the popularity of the relics it kept. In the eighth century, the basilica was restored by Pope Gregory II. After the Basilica fell into neglect, Pope Lucius II restored it in the 12th century, giving it a Romanesque appearance, with a nave, two aisles, belfry, and porch. The Cosmatesque pavement dates from this period. Of the eight original floors of the bell tower, only the last four remain visible; the first four floors are instead incorporated into the monastery below.

The foundation of the monastery dates to the 10th century. Over the centuries, various religious communities have alternated in the complex. Pope Leo IX, in 1049, entrusted the monastery to the Benedictines of Montecassino. In 1062 Pope Alexander II installed the Canons Regular of San Frediano di Lucca, who abandoned it during the period of the Avignonese papacy. Around 1370, Pope Urban V assigned Santa Croce to the Carthusians, who remained there until 1561, when the Lombard Cistercians of the Congregation of Saint Bernard took over. This congregation was finally suppressed in 2011 by a decree of the Congregation for Institutes of Consecrated Life and Societies of Apostolic Life, after an inquiry found evidence of liturgical and financial irregularities as well as irregular lifestyle.

Throughout the course of the Middle Ages the basilica was a popular destination for pilgrimages, particularly of a penitential type, and especially during the period of Lent. On Good Friday popes themselves walked barefoot, as a sign of penance, along the road that connected Saint John Lateran (official Cathedral of Rome) to the basilica of Santa Croce to come and venerate the relic of the Passion of Jesus. This tradition was then taken up by the Roman Missal and integrated into the Liturgy of Good Friday, which includes a period of adoration of the cross.

In the vault is a mosaic designed by Melozzo da Forlì, created some time before 1485 and depicting Jesus Blessing, Histories of the Cross, and various saints. The altar has a large statue of St. Helena, which was created by adapting an ancient statue of the Roman goddess Juno discovered at Ostia. The basilica was further modified in the 16th century.

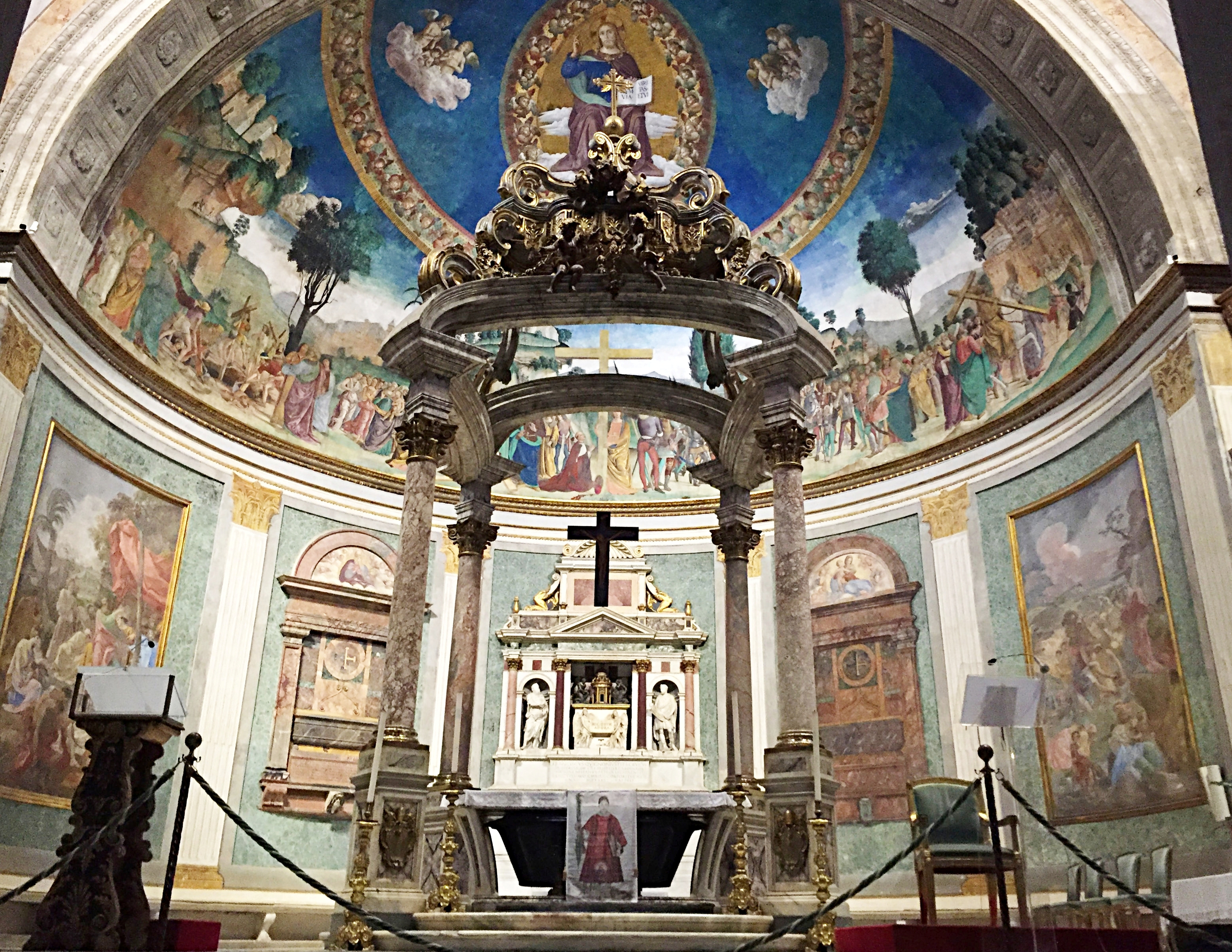
Basilica di Santa Croce in Gerusalemme, interior

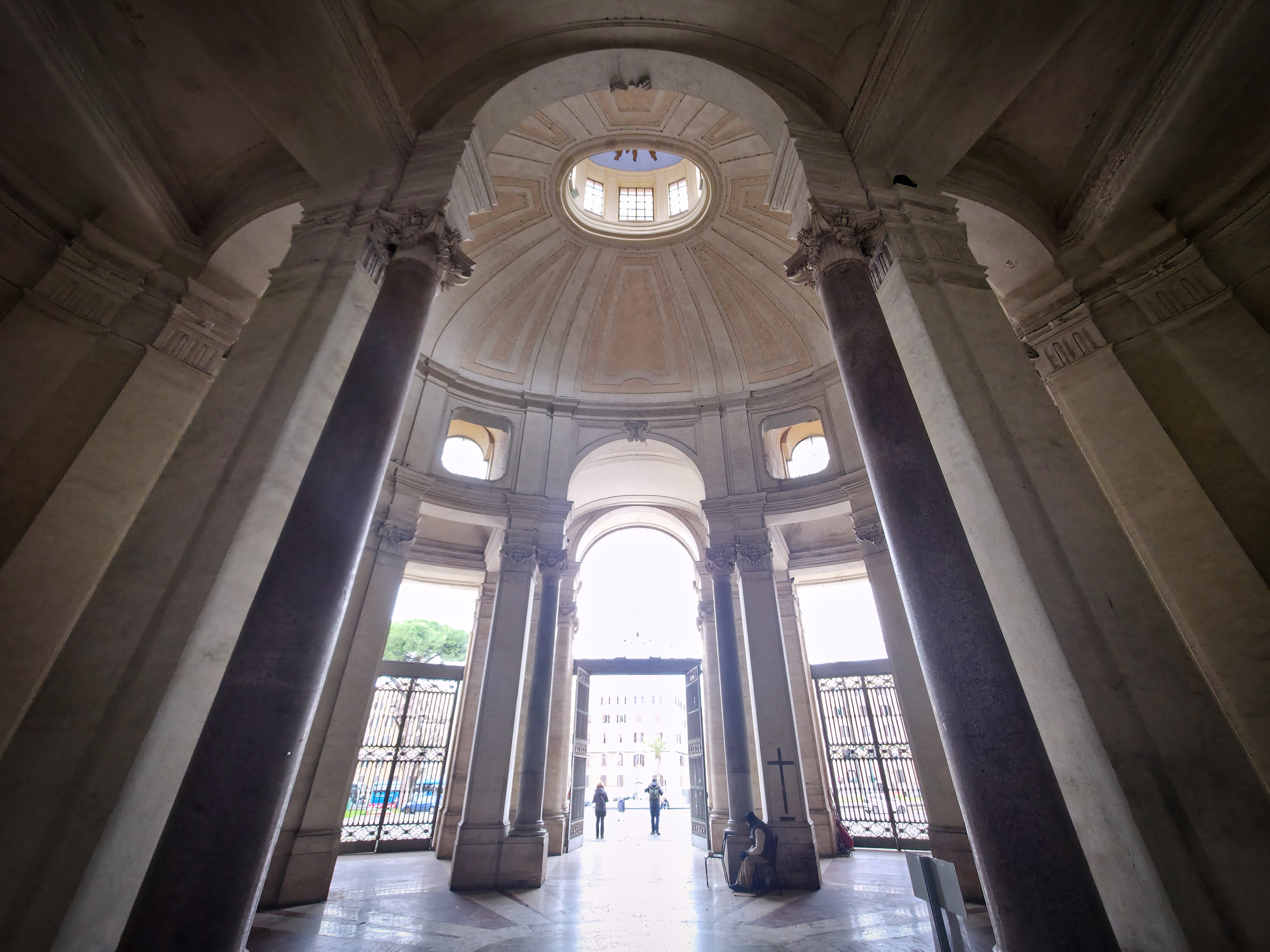
18th century oval-domed vestibule

In 1601, during his first stay in Rome, Peter Paul Rubens was commissioned by Archduke Albert of Austria to paint his first altarpiece, St. Helena with the True Cross, for one of the side chapels. Two of the side panels, St. Helena with the True Cross and The Mocking of Christ, are now in Grasse, France. The third, The Elevation of the Cross, has been lost. The church assumed its current late Baroque appearance under Pope Benedict XIV (1740–58), who had been its titular, prior to his elevation to the Papacy. This eighteenth-century restructuring led to a total renewal of the interior, with the vault painted by Corrado Giaquinto (a celebrated artist of the time). Finally, new streets were also opened to connect the Basilica to San Giovanni in Laterano and Santa Maria Maggiore. The façade of the Basilica, which was designed by Pietro Passalacqua and Domenico Gregorini, shares the typical late Roman Baroque style of these other basilicas.

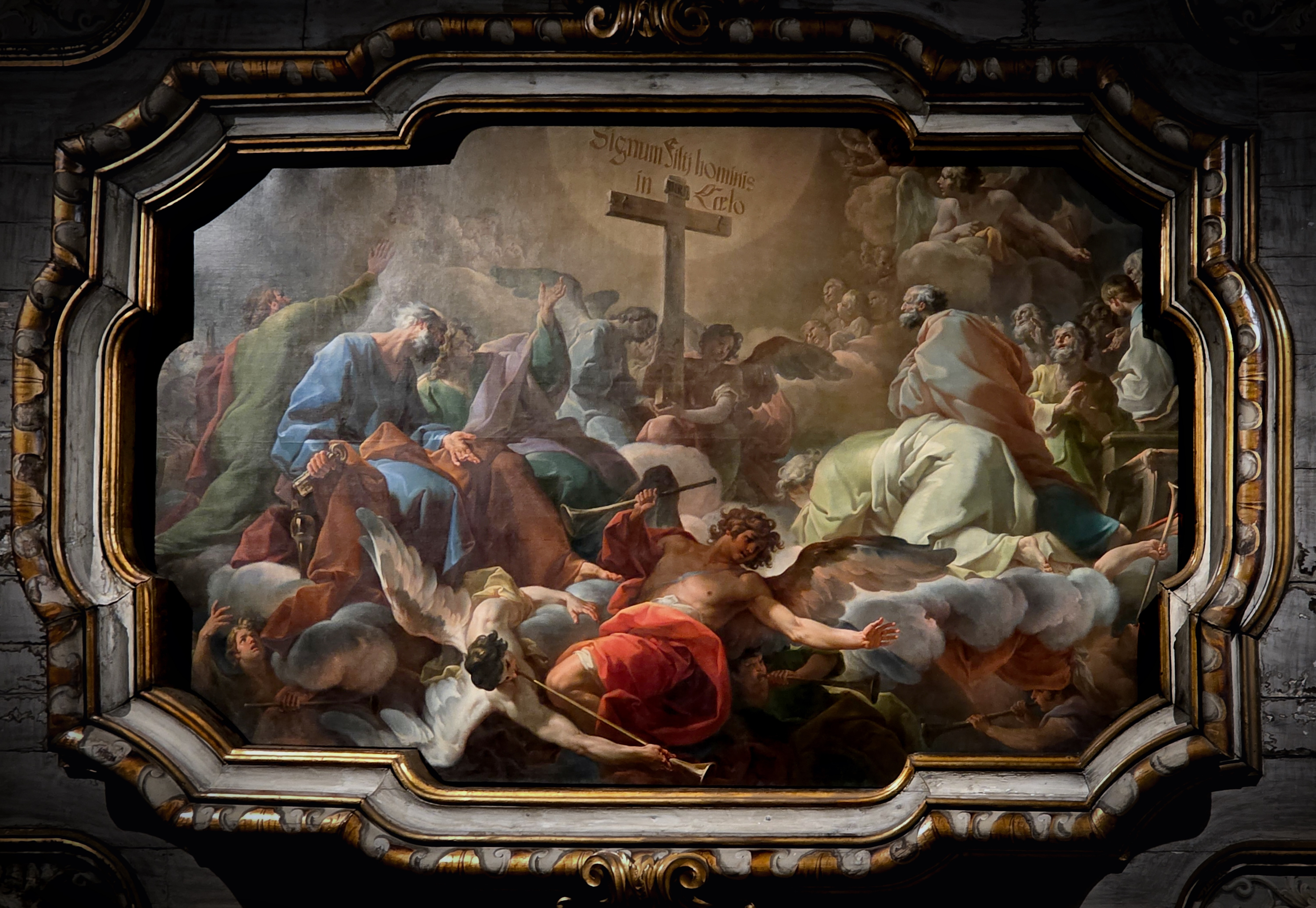
Ceiling mural by Corrado Giaquinto

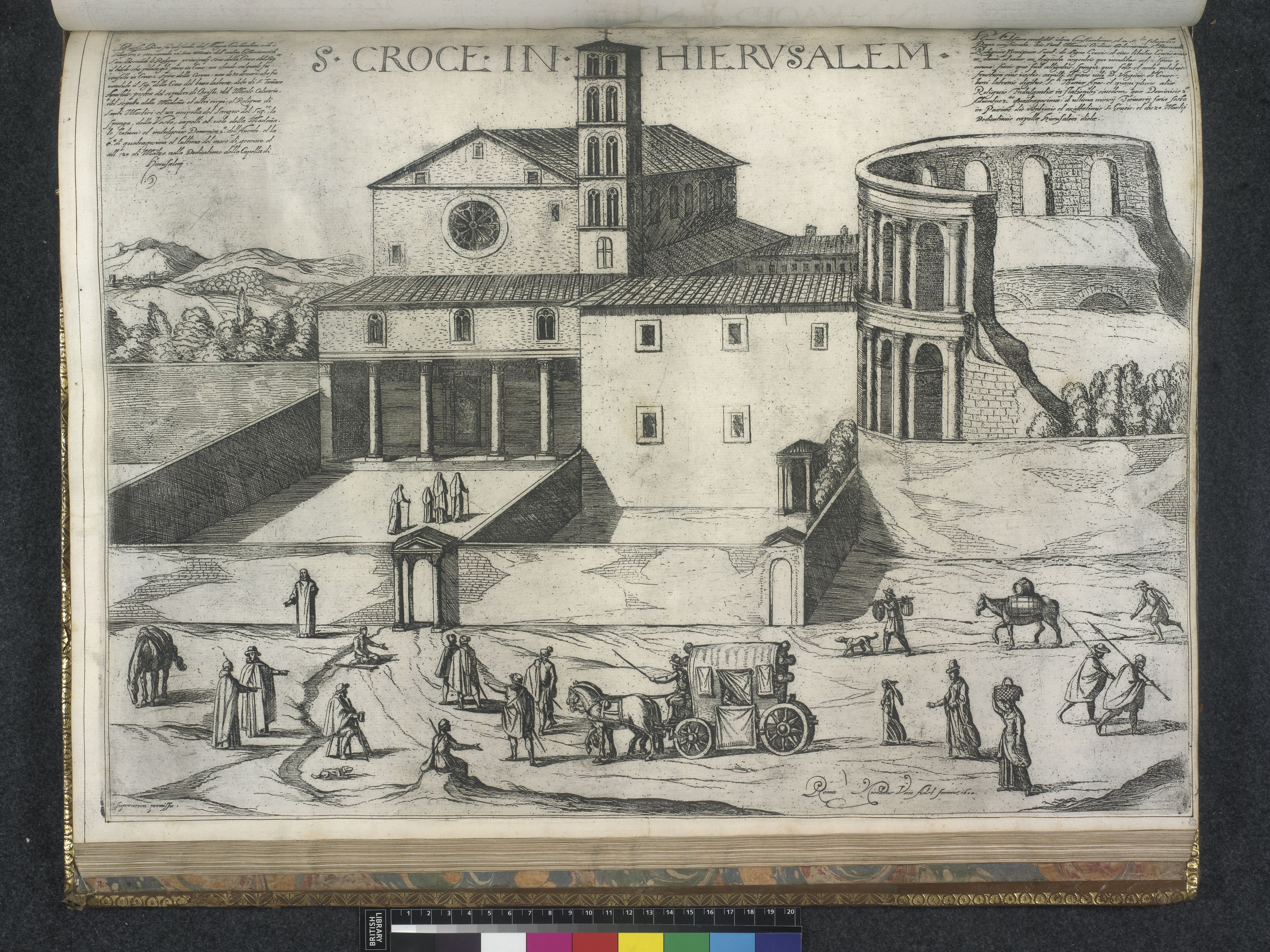
Renaissance-era engraving of Santa Croce in Gerusalemme

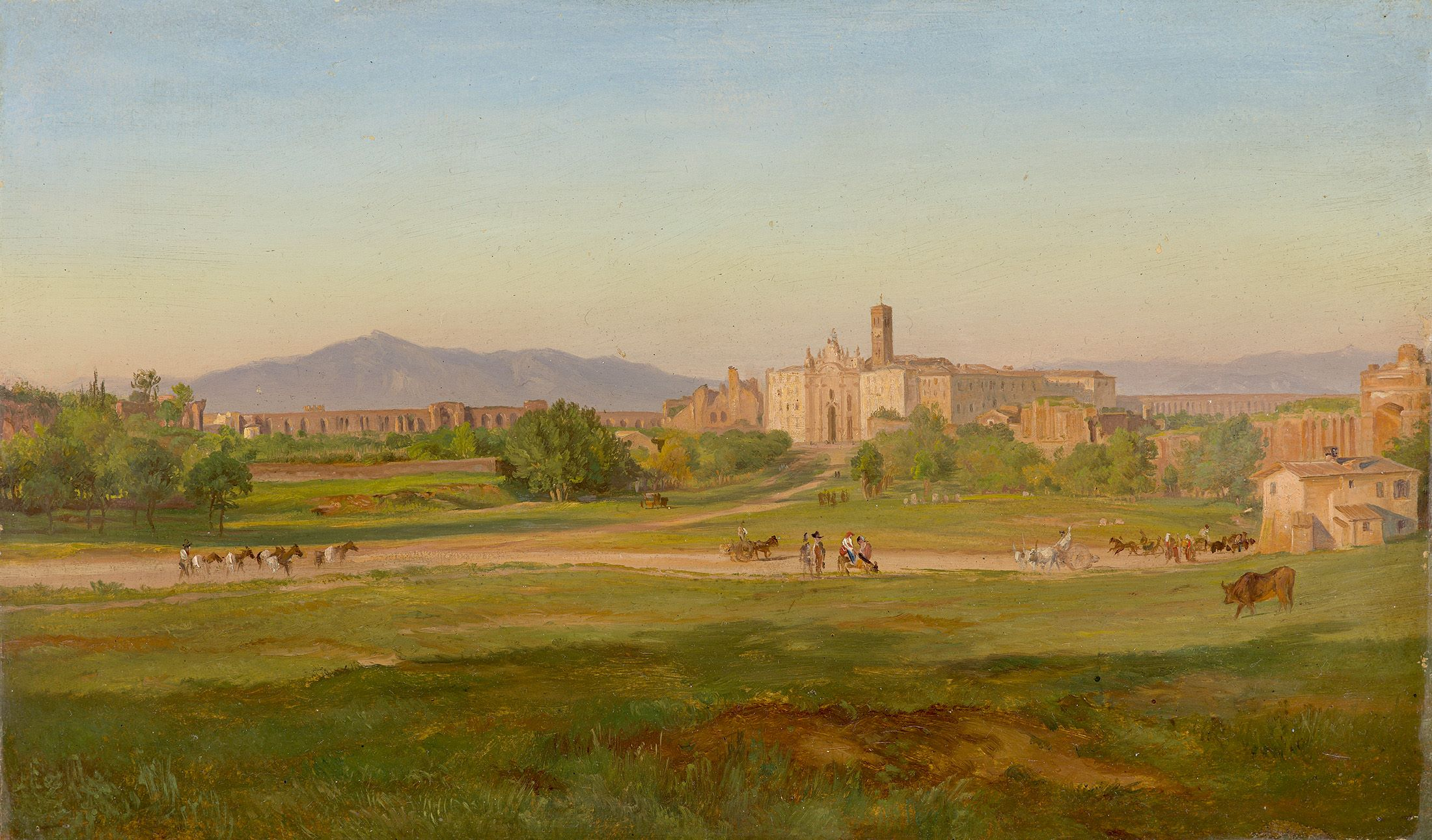
Santa Croce in Gerusalemme surrounded by countryside, 1848 painting

== Cappella delle Reliquie ==
Several famous relics of disputed authenticity are housed in the Cappella delle Reliquie, built in 1930 by architect Florestano Di Fausto, including part of the Elogium or Titulus Crucis, i.e. the panel which was hung on Christ's Cross (generally either ignored by scholars or considered to be a medieval forgery); two thorns of the Crown of Thorns; part of a nail; the index finger of St. Thomas; and three small wooden pieces of the True Cross. A much larger piece of the True Cross was taken from the Basilica on the instructions of Pope Urban VIII in 1629 to St. Peter's Basilica, where it is kept near the colossal statue of St. Empress Helena sculpted by Andrea Bolgi in 1639.

== Other art ==
The apse of the Basilica includes frescoes telling the Legends of the True Cross, attributed to Melozzo, Antoniazzo Romano, and Marco Palmezzano. The Museum of the Basilica houses a mosaic icon which, according to the legend, Pope Gregory I had made after a vision of Christ. The icon, however, is believed to have been given to the Basilica around 1385 by Raimondo Del Balzo Orsini. Notable also is the tomb of Cardinal Francisco de Quiñones sculpted by Jacopo Sansovino in 1536.

== List of Cardinal-Priests ==
- Amicus (1120 – 1121/2)
- Gerardo Caccianemici (1123–44)
- Ubaldo Caccianemici (1144 – 1170/1171)
- Ardoino da Piacenza (1178–1182)
- Albinus (March 1185–1189)
- Leone Brancaleone (1202–1224)
- Pietro d'Aquila (1294–1298)
- Teodorico Ranieri (1298–1299)
- Raymond de Canillac (1350–1361)
- Gui de Maillesec (1375–1384)
- Cosma Gentile Migliorati (1389–1404)
- Giovanni Migliorati (1405–1410)
- Francesco Lando (1411–1424)
- Niccolò Albergati (1426–1433)
- Domenico Capranica (1444–1458)
- Angelo Capranica (1460–1472)
- Pedro González de Mendoza (1478–1495)
- Bernardino López de Carvajal (1495–1507), in commendam (1507–1511)
- Antonio Maria Ciocchi del Monte, in commendam (1511–1527)
- Francisco de Quiñones (1527–1540)
- Marcello Cervini (1540–1555)
- Bartolomé de la Cueva de Albuquerque (1555–1562)
- Giovanni Antonio Capizucchi (1562–1565)
- Francisco Pacheco de Toledo (1565–1579)
- Albert VII, Archduke of Austria (1580–1598)
- Francisco de Múxica Guzmán de Avila (1599–1606)
- Ascanio Colonna (1606)
- Antonio Zapata y Cisneros (1606–1616)
- Gaspar de Borja y Velasco (1616–1630)
- Baltasar Moscoso y Sandoval (1630–1665)
- Alfonso Litta (1666–1679)
- Johann Eberhard Neidhardt SJ (1679–1681)
- Decio Azzolino the younger (1681–1683)
- vacant (1683–1689)
- Pedro de Salazar (1689–1706)
- Ulisse Giuseppe Gozzadini (1709–1728)
- Prospero Lambertini (1728–1740)
- Giuseppe Firrao (seniore) (1740–1744)
- Gioacchino Besozzi (1744–1755)
- Luca Melchiore Tempi (1757–1762)
- Lodovico Valenti (1762–1763)
- Nicola Serra (1766–1767)
- Antonio Eugenio Visconti (1775–1788)
- František de Paula Hrzán z Harrasova (1788–1804)
- Vacant (1804–1816)
- Alessandro Malvasia (1816–1819)
- Placido Zurla (1823–1834)
- Alessandro Giustiniani (1834–1843)
- Antonio Maria Cagiano de Azevedo (1844–1854)
- János Scitovszky (1854–1866)
- Raffaele Monaco La Valletta (1868–1884)
- Lucido Maria Parocchi (1884–1889)
- Pierre-Lambert Goossens (1889–1906)
- Benedetto Lorenzelli (1907–1915)
- Willem Marinus van Rossum (1915–1932)
- Pietro Fumasoni Biondi (1933–1960)
- Giuseppe Ferretto (1961)
- Efrem Forni (1962–1976)
- Victor Razafimahatratra (1976–1993)
- Miloslav Vlk (1994–2017)
- Juan José Omella (2017–present)

== Notes ==
Preceded by Santa Croce in Via Flaminia	Landmarks of Rome; Santa Croce in Gerusalemme	Succeeded by Sant'Eugenio
