= Horti Pompeiani =

Ancient Gardens built by Pompey the Great

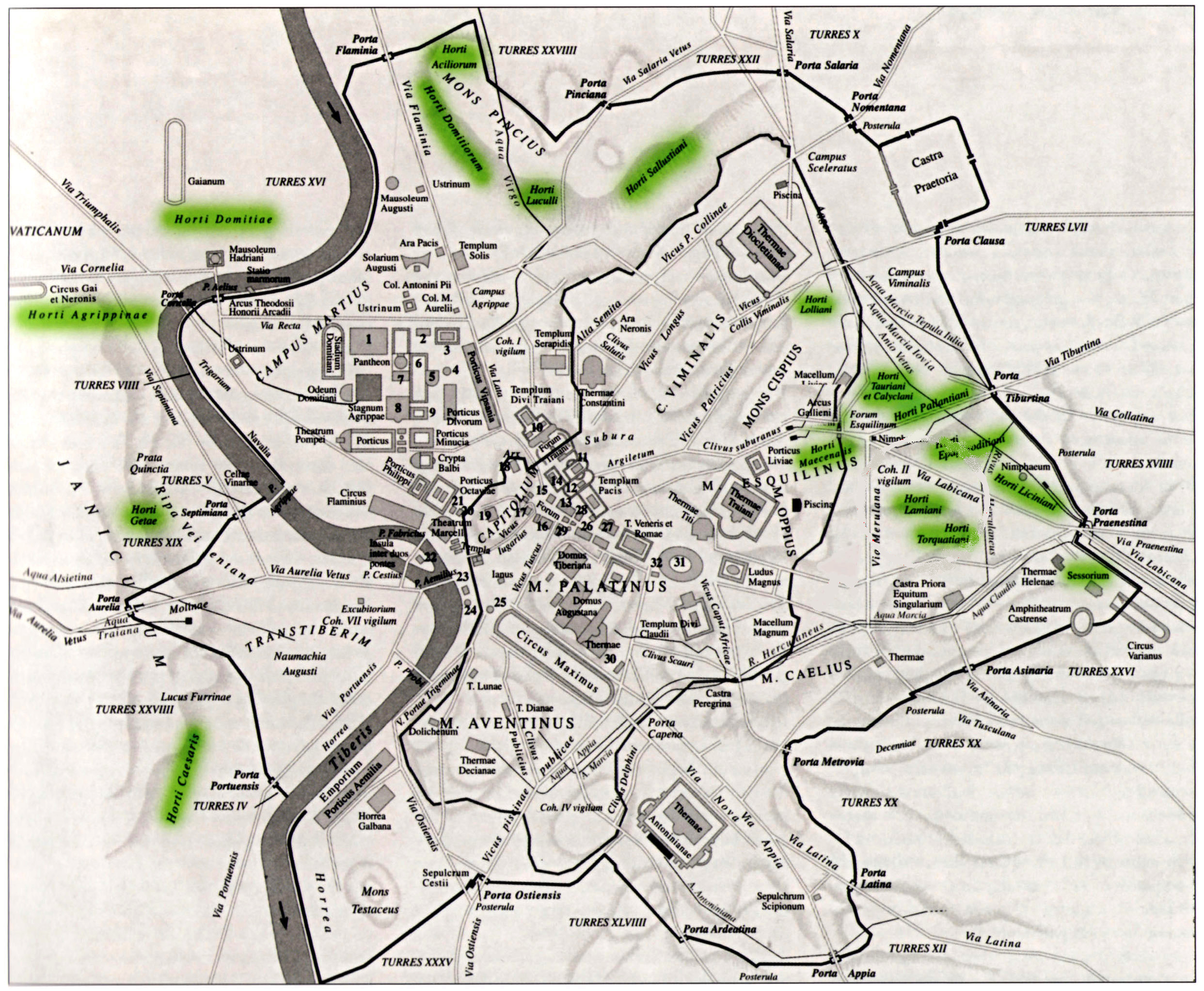
Horti of ancient Rome

The Horti Pompeiani was the name of two gardens built by Pompey the Great. One surrounded the Theatre of Pompey, built in 55 BC, the other were a set of private gardens on the 'Carinae' slope of the Esquiline Hill, surrounding Pompey's villa. After Pompey's death, Julius Caesar gave these private gardens to Mark Antony.

The villa on the 'Carinae' slope was one of two properties owned by Pompey that may have been known as the 'Domus Rostrata', since Pompey had decorated it with the prows or rostra of the pirate ships he had defeated. The other is the new villa that Pompey built near his theatre, outside the city walls in the Campus Martius.

== See also ==
- Roman gardens

== Bibliography ==
- L. Richardson, jr, A New Topographical Dictionary of Ancient Rome, Baltimore - London 1992 page 201
