= History of the Roman Empire =

Roman Empire: Imperium Romanum (Latin); Senatus populusque Romanus Senate and People of Rome (Note: Other ways of referring to the "Roman Empire" among the Romans and Greeks themselves included Res publica Romana or Imperium Romanorum (also in Greek: Βασιλεία τῶν Ῥωμαίων – Basileíā tôn Rhōmaíōn – ["Dominion (Literally 'kingdom') of the Romans"]) and Romania. Res publica means Roman "commonwealth" and can refer to both the Republican and the Imperial eras. Imperium Romanum (or Romanorum) refers to the territorial extent of Roman authority. Populus Romanus ("the Roman people") was/is often used to indicate the Roman state in matters involving other nations. The term Romania, initially a colloquial term for the empire's territory as well as a collective name for its inhabitants, appears in Greek and Latin sources from the 4th century onward and was eventually carried over to the Byzantine Empire (see R. L. Wolff, "Romania: The Latin Empire of Constantinople" in Speculum 23 (1948), pp. 1–34 and especially pp. 2–3).); Βασιλεία Ῥωμαίων (Ancient Greek) Basileía Rhōmaíōn
- 27 BC – AD 395; 395–476 (Western); 395–1453 (Eastern); 1204–1461 (Trebizond)
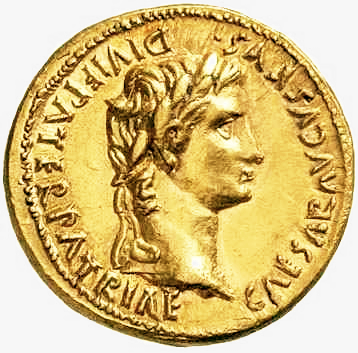
- Aureus of Augustus, the first Roman Emperor.

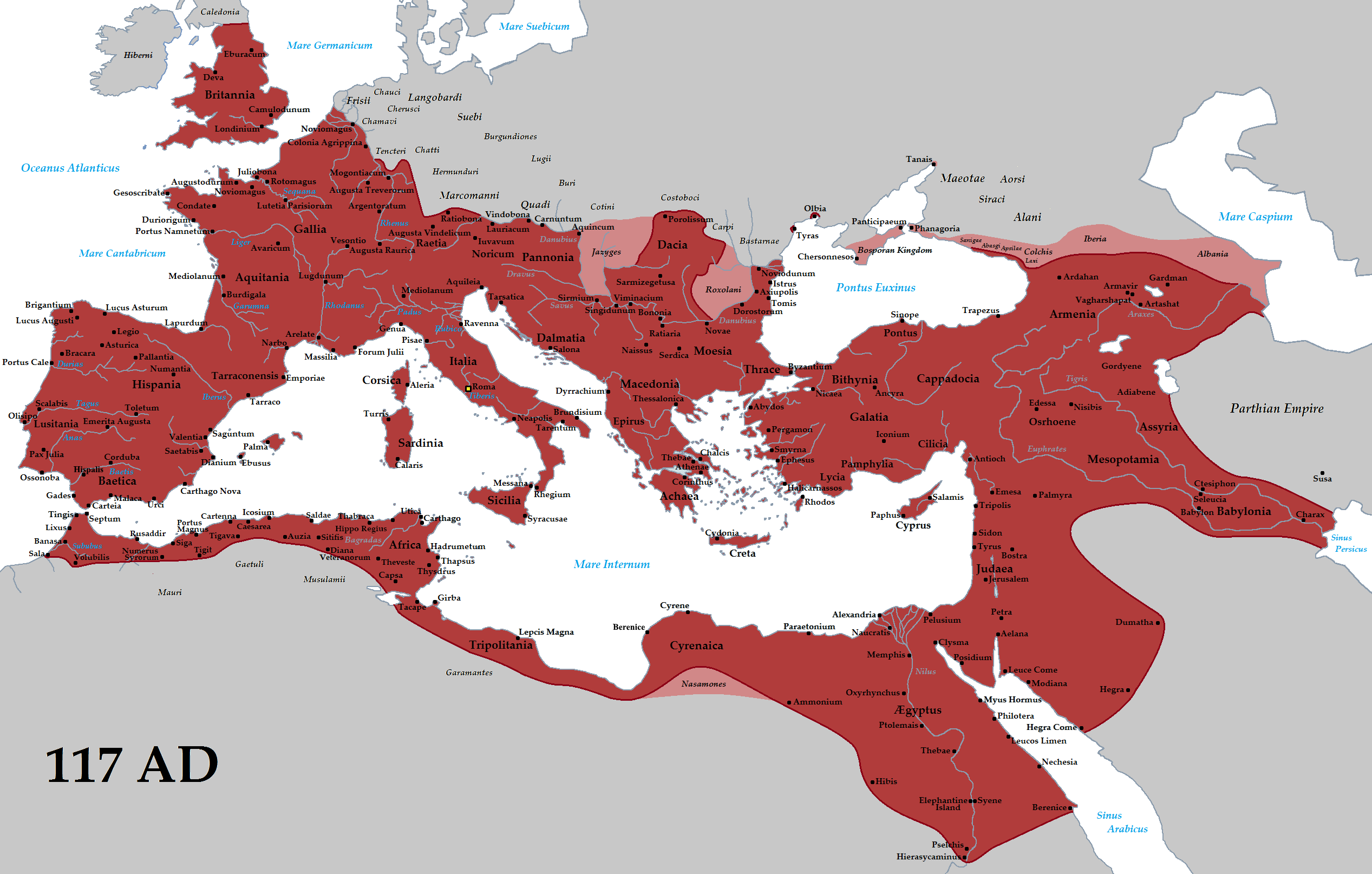
- The Roman Empire in AD 117, at its greatest extent. Regions east of the Euphrates river were held only in the years 116–117.
- Capital cities: Rome; Constantinople; also: Antioch, Arelate, Augusta Treverorum, Mediolanum, Nicomedia, Ravenna, Sirmium
- Common languages: Latin; Greek; numerous others
- Religion: Roman polytheism; Hellenistic polytheism; Imperial cult; numerous others; official from AD 380: Christianity
- Government: Autocracy
- Emperors
  - 27 BC – AD 14: Augustus
  - 98–117: Trajan
  - 138–161: Antoninus Pius
  - 270–275: Aurelian
  - 284–305: Diocletian
  - 306–337: Constantine I
  - 379–395: Theodosius I
  - 474–480: Julius Nepos (Note: Officially the final emperor of the Western empire.)
  - 475–476: Romulus Augustus
  - 527–565: Justinian I
  - 610–641: Heraclius
  - 780–797: Constantine VI
  - 976–1025: Basil II
  - 1143–1180: Manuel I
  - 1449–1453: Constantine XI (Note: Last emperor of the Eastern empire.)
- Legislature: Roman Senate; Byzantine Senate
- Historical era: Classical Antiquity to Late Middle Ages
  - Last war of the Roman Republic: 32–30 BC
  - Empire established: 30–2 BC
  - Empire at its greatest extent: AD 117
  - Constantinople inaugurated: 11 May 330
  - East–West division: 17 January 395
  - Fall of the West: 4 September 476
  - Sack of Constantinople: 12–15 April 1204
  - Reconquest of Constantinople: 25 July 1261
  - Fall of Constantinople: 29 May 1453

Area
- 25 BC: 2,750,000 km^{2} (1,060,000 sq mi)
- AD 117: 5,000,000 km^{2} (1,900,000 sq mi)
- AD 390: 4,400,000 km^{2} (1,700,000 sq mi)

Population
  - 25 BC: 56,800,000
- Currency: Denarius, Sestertius (Note: Abbreviated "HS". Prices and values are usually expressed in sesterces.), Aureus, Solidus (also called Nomisma) (Note: For currency denominations by period see Roman Empire page.)
Preceded by	Succeeded by
Roman Republic	Byzantine Empire

Territorial development of the Roman Republic and of the Roman Empire (Animated map)

The history of the Roman Empire covers the history of ancient Rome from the traditional end of the Roman Republic in 27 BC until the abdication of Romulus Augustulus in AD 476 in the West, and the Fall of Constantinople in the East in 1453. Ancient Rome became a territorial empire while still a republic but was then ruled by emperors, beginning with Octavian Augustus, the final victor of the republican civil wars.

Rome had begun expanding shortly after the founding of the Republic in the 6th century BC, though it did not expand outside the Italian Peninsula until the 3rd century BC, during the Punic Wars, after which the Republic expanded across the Mediterranean. Civil war engulfed Rome in the mid-1st century BC, first between Julius Caesar and Pompey, and finally between Octavian (Caesar's grand-nephew) and Mark Antony. Antony and his wife Cleopatra were defeated at the Battle of Actium in 31 BC, leading to the annexation of Ptolemaic Egypt. In 27 BC, the Senate gave Octavian the titles of Augustus ("venerated") and Princeps ("foremost"), thus beginning the Principate, the first epoch of Roman imperial history. Augustus' name was inherited by his successors, as well as his title of Imperator ("commander"), from which the term "emperor" is derived. Early emperors avoided any association with the ancient kings of Rome, instead presenting themselves as leaders of the Republic.

The success of Augustus in establishing principles of dynastic succession was limited by his outliving a number of talented potential heirs; the Julio-Claudian dynasty lasted for four more emperors—Tiberius, Caligula, Claudius, and Nero—before it yielded in AD 69 to the strife-torn Year of the Four Emperors, from which Vespasian emerged as victor. Vespasian became the founder of the brief Flavian dynasty, to be followed by the Nerva–Antonine dynasty which produced the "Five Good Emperors": Nerva, Trajan, Hadrian, Antoninus Pius and the philosophically inclined Marcus Aurelius. In the view of the Greek historian Cassius Dio, a contemporary observer, the accession of the emperor Commodus in AD 180 marked the descent "from a kingdom of gold to one of rust and iron" —a famous comment which has led some historians, notably Edward Gibbon, to take Commodus' reign as the beginning of the decline of the Roman Empire.

In 212, during the reign of Caracalla, Roman citizenship was granted to all freeborn inhabitants of the Empire. Despite this gesture of universality, the Severan dynasty was tumultuous—an emperor's reign was ended routinely by his murder or execution—and following its collapse, the Empire was engulfed by the Crisis of the Third Century, a 50-year period of invasions, civil strife, economic disorder, and epidemic disease. In defining historical epochs, this crisis is typically viewed as marking the start of the Later Roman Empire, (Note: "The late Roman period (which we are defining as, roughly, AD 250–450)...") and also the transition from Classical to Late antiquity. In the reign of Philip the Arab (r. 244–249), Rome celebrated its thousandth anniversary with the Saecular Games. Diocletian (r. 284–305) restored stability to the empire, modifying the role of princeps and adopting the style of dominus, "master" or "lord", thus beginning the period known as the Dominate. Diocletian's reign also brought the Empire's most concerted effort against Christianity, the "Great Persecution". The state of absolute monarchy that began with Diocletian endured until the fall of the Eastern Roman Empire in 1453.

In 286, the empire was split into two halves, each with its own emperor and court. The empire was further divided into four regions in 293, beginning the Tetrarchy. By this time, Rome itself was reduced to a symbolic status, as emperors ruled from different cities. Diocletian abdicated voluntarily along with his co-augustus, but the Tetrarchy almost immediately fell apart. The civil wars ended in 324 with the victory of Constantine I, who became the first emperor to convert to Christianity and who founded Constantinople as a new capital for the whole empire. The reign of Julian, who attempted to restore Classical Roman and Hellenistic religion, only briefly interrupted the succession of Christian emperors of the Constantinian dynasty. During the decades of the Valentinianic and Theodosian dynasties, the established practice of dividing the empire in two was continued. Theodosius I, the last emperor to rule over both the Eastern empire and the whole Western empire, died in 395 after making Christianity the official religion of the Empire.

The Western Roman Empire began to disintegrate in the early 5th century as the Germanic migrations and invasions of the Migration Period overwhelmed the capacity of the Empire to assimilate the immigrants and fight off the invaders. Most chronologies place the end of the Western Roman Empire in 476, when Romulus Augustulus was forced to abdicate to the Germanic warlord Odoacer. The Eastern empire exercised diminishing control over the west over the course of the next century and was reduced to Anatolia and the Balkans by the 7th. The empire in the east—known today as the Byzantine Empire, but referred to in its time as "Roman"—ended in 1453 with the death of Constantine XI and the fall of Constantinople to the Ottoman Turks (see History of the Byzantine Empire).

== Augustus (27 BC–AD 14) ==
Octavian, the grandnephew and adopted son of Julius Caesar, had made himself a central military figure during the chaotic period following Caesar's assassination. In 43 BC, at the age of twenty, he became one of the three members of the Second Triumvirate, a political alliance with Marcus Lepidus and Mark Antony. Octavian and Antony defeated the last of Caesar's assassins in 42 BC at the Battle of Philippi, although after this point tensions began to rise between the two. The triumvirate ended in 32 BC, torn apart by the competing ambitions of its members: Lepidus was forced into exile and Antony, who had allied himself with his lover Queen Cleopatra VII of Egypt, committed suicide in 30 BC following his defeat at the Battle of Actium (31 BC) by the fleet of Octavian. Octavian subsequently annexed Egypt to the empire.

Now sole ruler of Rome, Octavian began a full-scale reformation of military, fiscal and political matters. The Senate granted him power over appointing its membership and several successive consulships, allowing him to operate within the existing constitutional machinery and thus reject titles that Romans associated with monarchy, such as rex ("king"). The dictatorship, a military office in the early Republic typically lasting only for the six-month military campaigning season, had been resurrected first by Sulla in the late 80s BC and then by Julius Caesar in the mid-40s; the title dictator was never again used. As the adopted heir of Julius Caesar, Octavian had taken "Caesar" as a component of his name, and handed down the name to his heirs of the Julio-Claudian dynasty. With Galba, the first emperor outside the dynasty, Caesar evolved into a formal title.

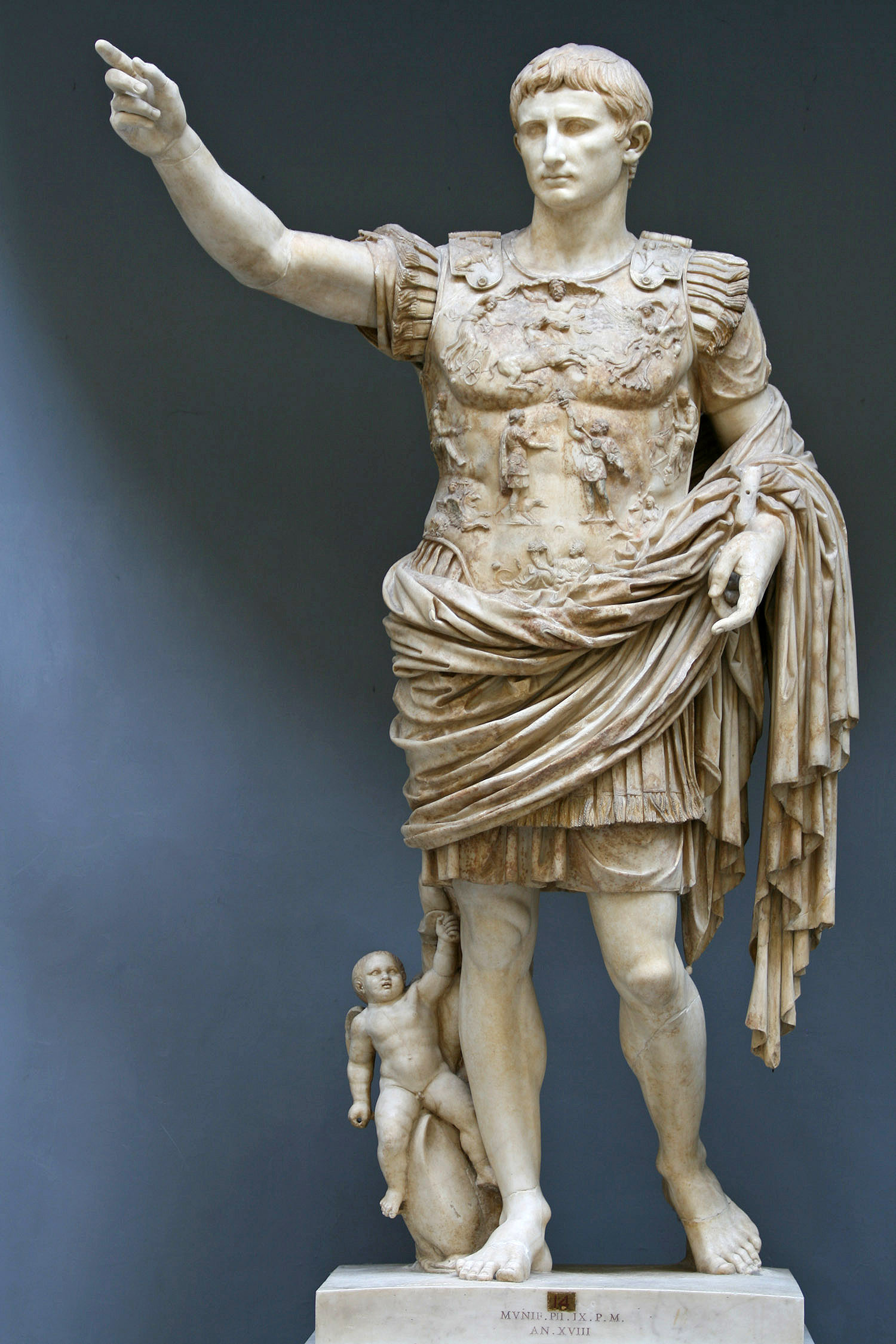
The Augustus of Prima Porta

Augustus created his novel and historically unique position by consolidating the constitutional powers of several Republican offices. He renounced his consulship in 23 BC, but retained his consular imperium, leading to a second compromise between Augustus and the Senate known as the Second settlement. Augustus was granted the authority of a tribune (tribunicia potestas), though not the title, which allowed him to call together the Senate and people at will and lay business before it, veto the actions of either the Assembly or the Senate, preside over elections, and it gave him the right to speak first at any meeting. Also included in Augustus's tribunician authority were powers usually reserved for the Roman censor; these included the right to supervise public morals and scrutinise laws to ensure they were in the public interest, as well as the ability to hold a census and determine the membership of the Senate. No tribune of Rome ever had these powers, and there was no precedent within the Roman system for consolidating the powers of the tribune and the censor into a single position, nor was Augustus ever elected to the office of Censor. Whether censorial powers were granted to Augustus as part of his tribunician authority, or he simply assumed those, is a matter of debate.

In addition to those powers, Augustus was granted sole imperium within the city of Rome itself; all armed forces in the city, formerly under the control of the prefects, were now under the sole authority of Augustus. Additionally, Augustus was granted imperium proconsulare maius (literally: "eminent proconsular command"), the right to interfere in any province and override the decisions of any governor. With imperium maius, Augustus was the only individual able to grant a triumph to a successful general as he was ostensibly the leader of the entire Roman army.

The Senate re-classified the provinces at the frontiers (where the vast majority of the legions were stationed) as imperial provinces, and gave control of those to Augustus. The peaceful provinces were re-classified as senatorial provinces, governed as they had been during the Republic by members of the Senate sent out annually by the central government. Senators were prohibited from so much as visiting Roman Egypt, given its great wealth and history as a base of power for opposition to the new emperor. Taxes from the imperial provinces went into the fiscus, the fund administered by persons chosen by and answerable to Augustus. The revenue from senatorial provinces continued to be sent to the state treasury (aerarium), under the supervision of the Senate.

The Roman legions, which had reached an unprecedented 50 in number because of the civil wars, were reduced to 28. Several legions, particularly those with members of doubtful loyalties, were simply disbanded. Other legions were united, a fact hinted by the title Gemina (Twin). Augustus also created nine special cohorts to maintain peace in Italia, with three, the Praetorian Guard, kept in Rome. Control of the fiscus enabled Augustus to ensure the loyalty of the legions through their pay.

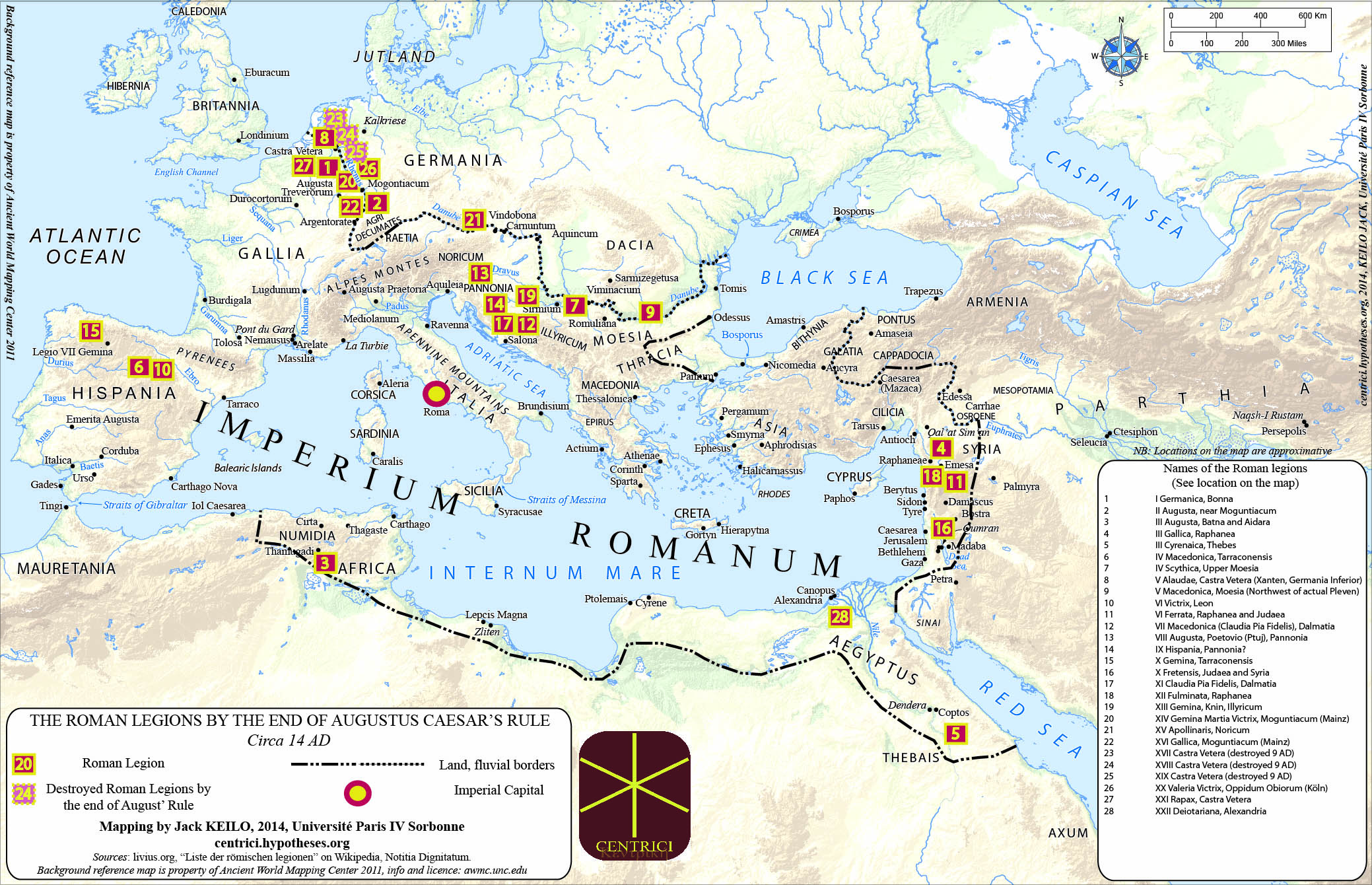
Map of Roman legions by 14 AD

Augustus completed the conquest of Hispania, while subordinate generals expanded Roman possessions in Africa and Asia Minor. Augustus' final task was to ensure an orderly succession of his powers. His stepson Tiberius had conquered Pannonia, Dalmatia, Raetia, and temporarily Germania for the Empire, and was thus a prime candidate. In 6 BC, Augustus granted some of his powers to his stepson, and soon after he recognised Tiberius as his heir. In AD 13, a law was passed which extended Augustus' powers over the provinces to Tiberius, so that Tiberius' legal powers were equivalent to, and independent from, those of Augustus.

Attempting to secure the borders of the Empire upon the rivers Danube and Elbe, Augustus ordered the invasions of Illyria, Moesia, and Pannonia (south of the Danube), and Germania (west of the Elbe). At first everything went as planned, but then disaster struck. The Illyrian tribes revolted and had to be crushed, and three full legions under the command of Publius Quinctilius Varus were ambushed and destroyed at the Battle of the Teutoburg Forest in AD 9 by Germanic tribes led by Arminius. Being cautious, Augustus secured all territories west of the Rhine and contented himself with retaliatory raids. The rivers Rhine and Danube became the permanent borders of the Roman empire in the North.

In AD 14, Augustus died at the age of seventy-five, having ruled the Empire for forty years, and was succeeded as emperor by Tiberius.

=== Sources ===
The Augustan Age is not as well documented as the age of Caesar and Cicero. Livy wrote his history during Augustus's reign and covered all of Roman history through to 9 BC, but only epitomes survive of his coverage of the late Republican and Augustan periods. Important primary sources for the Augustan period include:

- Res Gestae Divi Augusti, Augustus's highly partisan autobiography,
- Historiae Romanae by Velleius Paterculus, the best annals of the Augustan period,
- Controversiae and Suasoriae of Seneca the Elder.

Works of poetry such as Ovid's Fasti and Propertius's Fourth Book, legislation and engineering also provide important insights into Roman life of the time. Archaeology, including maritime archaeology, aerial surveys, epigraphic inscriptions on buildings, and Augustan coinage, has also provided valuable evidence about economic, social and military conditions.

Secondary ancient sources on the Augustan Age include Tacitus, Dio Cassius, Plutarch and Lives of the Twelve Caesars by Suetonius. Josephus's Jewish Antiquities is the important source for Judea, which became a province during Augustus's reign.

== Julio-Claudian Dynasty (14–68) ==
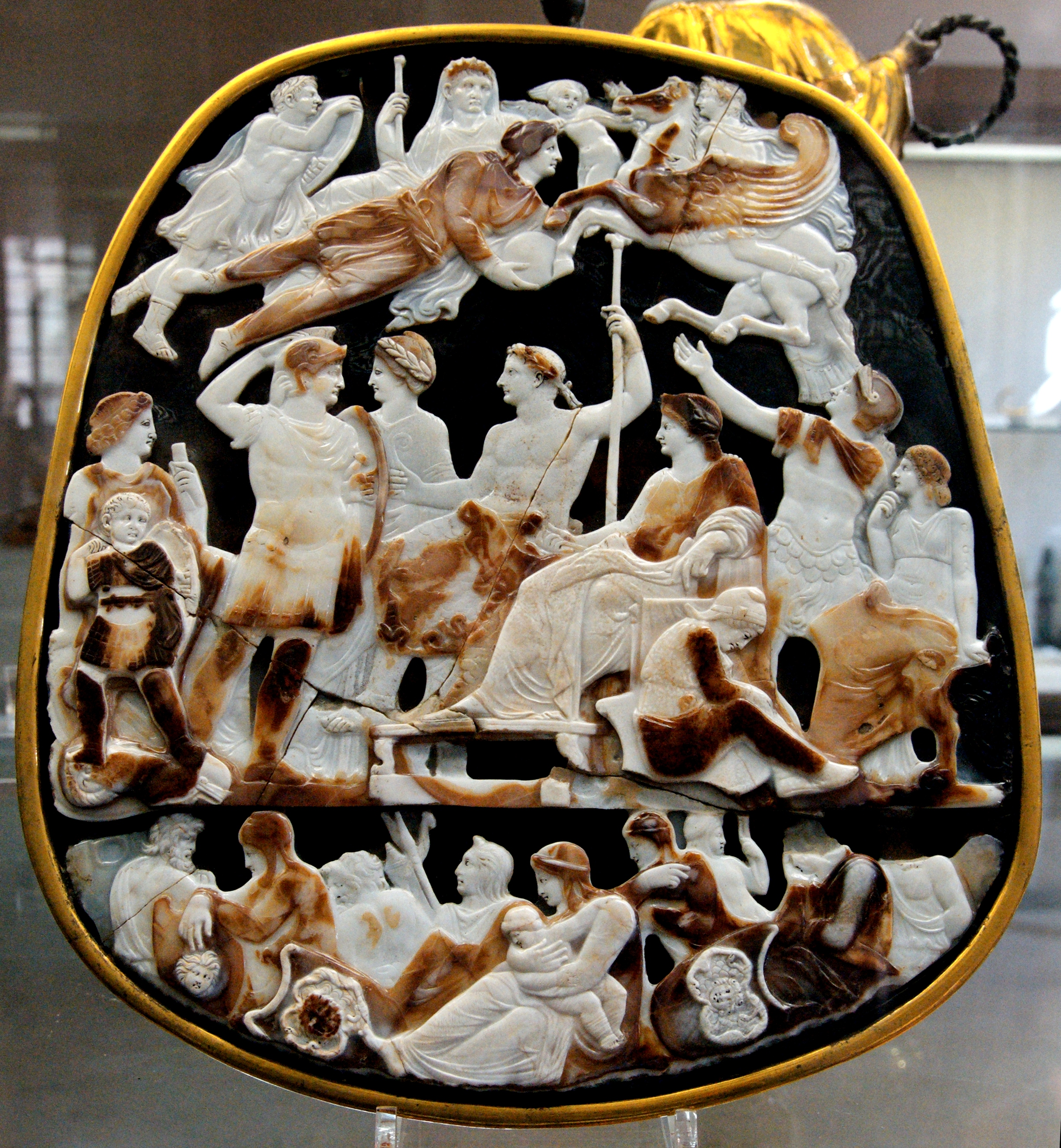
The Great Cameo of France, a cameo five layers sardonyx, Rome, c. AD 23, depicting the emperor Tiberius seated with his mother Livia and in front of his designated heir Germanicus, with the latter's wife Agrippina the Elder; above them float the deceased members of their house: Augustus, Drusus Julius Caesar, and Nero Claudius Drusus

Augustus had three grandsons by his daughter Julia the Elder: Gaius Caesar, Lucius Caesar and Agrippa Postumus. None of the three lived long enough to succeed him. He therefore was succeeded by his stepson Tiberius. Tiberius was the son of Livia, the third wife of Augustus, by her first marriage to Tiberius Nero. Augustus was a scion of the gens Julia (the Julian family), one of the most ancient patrician clans of Rome, while Tiberius was a scion of the gens Claudia, only slightly less ancient than the Julians. Their three immediate successors were all descended both from the gens Claudia, through Tiberius' brother Nero Claudius Drusus, and from gens Julia, either through Julia the Elder, Augustus' daughter from his first marriage (Caligula and Nero), or through Augustus' sister Octavia Minor (Claudius). Historians thus refer to their dynasty as "Julio-Claudian".

=== Tiberius (14–37) ===
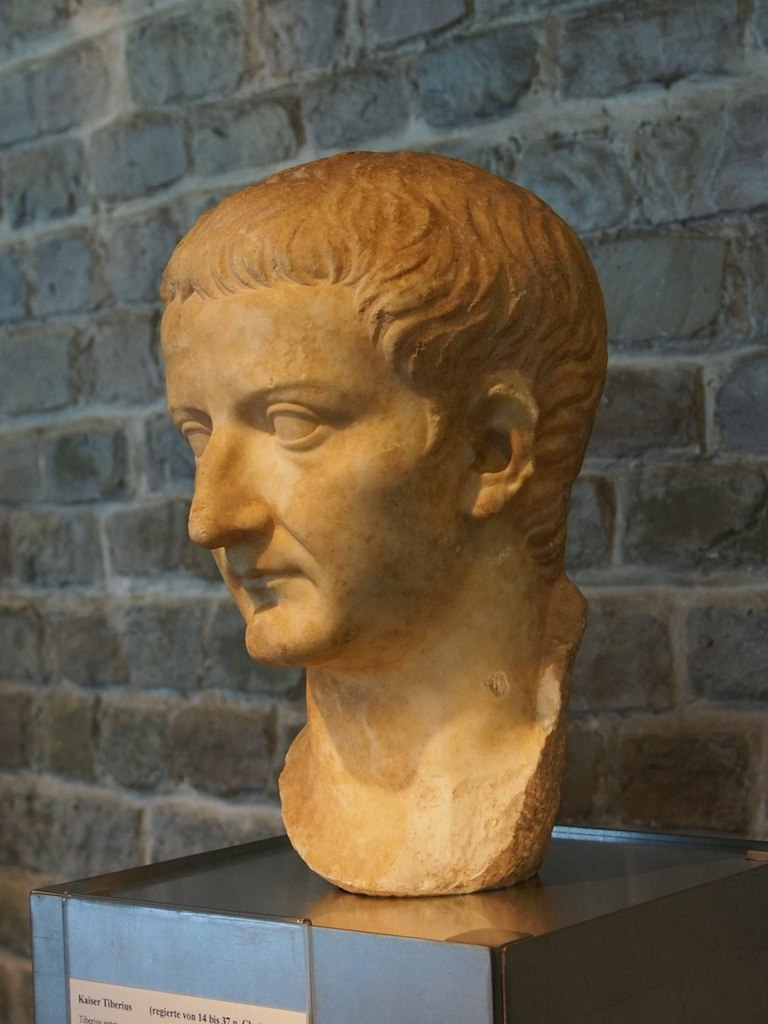
Bust of Tiberius, AD 14–37

The early years of Tiberius's reign were relatively peaceful. Tiberius secured the overall power of Rome and enriched its treasury. However, his rule soon became characterised by paranoia. He began a series of treason trials and executions, which continued until his death in 37. He left power in the hands of the commander of the guard, Lucius Aelius Sejanus. Tiberius himself retired to live at his villa on the island of Capri in 26, leaving administration in the hands of Sejanus, who carried on the persecutions with contentment. Sejanus also began to consolidate his own power; in 31 he was named co-consul with Tiberius and married Livilla, the emperor's niece. At this point he was "hoist by his own petard": the emperor's paranoia, which he had so ably exploited for his own gain, turned against him. Sejanus was put to death, along with many of his associates, the same year. The persecutions continued until Tiberius' death in 37.

=== Caligula (37–41) ===
At the time of Tiberius's death most of the people who might have succeeded him had been killed. The logical successor (and Tiberius' own choice) was his 24-year-old grandnephew, Gaius, better known as "Caligula" ("little boots"). Caligula was a son of Germanicus and Agrippina the Elder. His paternal grandparents were Nero Claudius Drusus and Antonia Minor, and his maternal grandparents were Marcus Vipsanius Agrippa and Julia the Elder. He was thus a descendant of both Augustus and Livia.

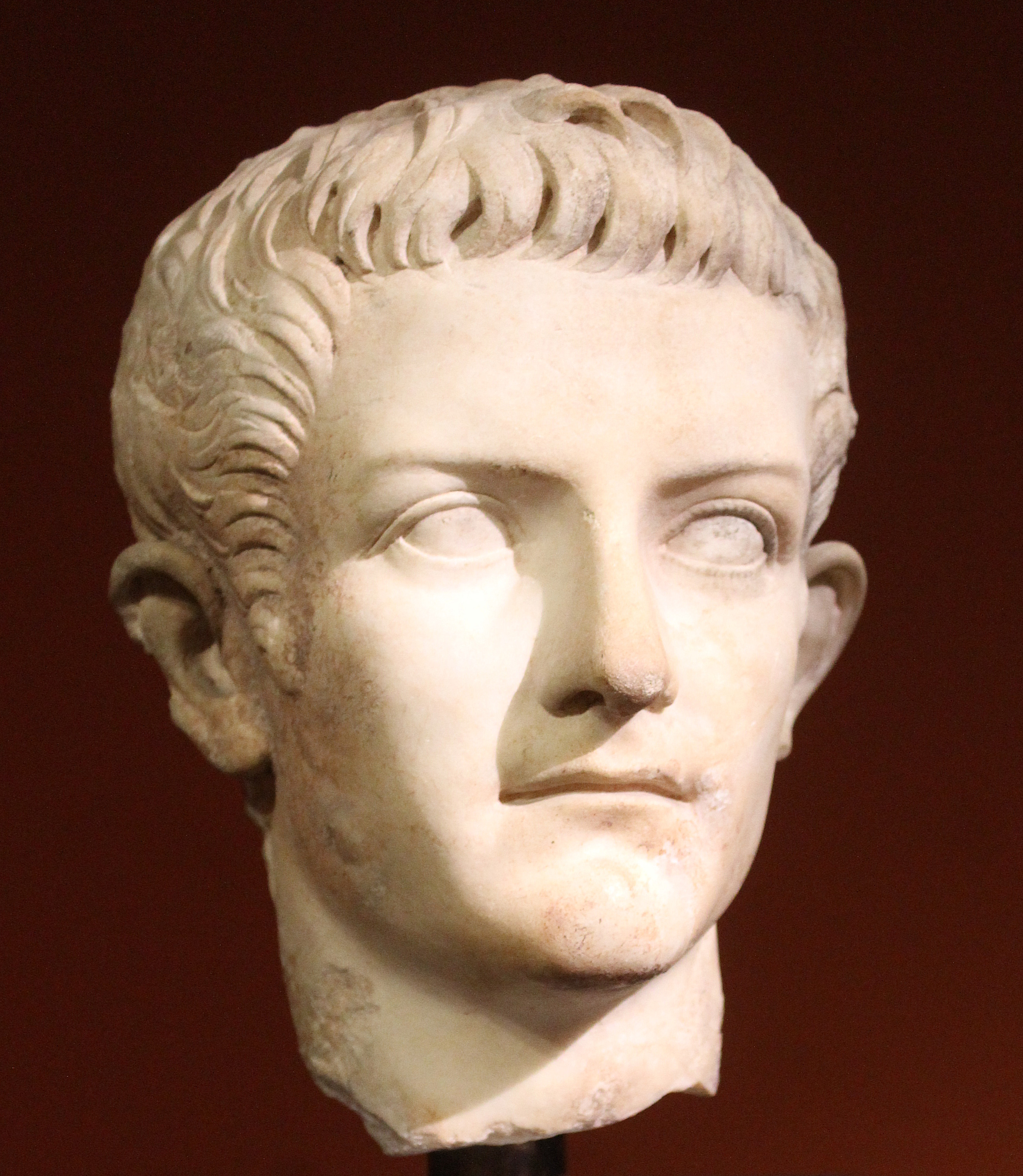
Marble bust of Caligula in the Liebieghaus, Frankfurt

Caligula started out well, by putting an end to the persecutions and burning his uncle's records. Unfortunately, he quickly lapsed into illness. The Caligula that emerged in late 37 demonstrated features of mental instability that led modern commentators to diagnose him with such illnesses as encephalitis, which can cause mental derangement, hyperthyroidism, or even a nervous breakdown (perhaps brought on by the stress of his position). Whatever the cause, there was an obvious shift in his reign from this point on, leading his biographers to label him as insane.

Most of what history remembers of Caligula comes from Suetonius, in his book Lives of the Twelve Caesars. According to Suetonius, Caligula once planned to appoint his favourite horse Incitatus to the Roman Senate. He ordered his soldiers to invade Britain to fight the sea god Neptune, but changed his mind at the last minute and had them pick sea shells on the northern end of France instead. It is believed he carried on incestuous relations with his three sisters: Julia Livilla, Drusilla and Agrippina the Younger. He ordered a statue of himself to be erected in Herod's Temple at Jerusalem, which would have undoubtedly led to revolt had he not been dissuaded from this plan by his friend king Agrippa I. He ordered people to be secretly killed, and then called them to his palace. When they did not appear, he would jokingly remark that they must have committed suicide.

In 41, Caligula was assassinated by the commander of the guard Cassius Chaerea. Also killed were his fourth wife Caesonia and their daughter Julia Drusilla. For two days following his assassination, the Senate debated the merits of restoring the Republic.

=== Claudius (41–54) ===
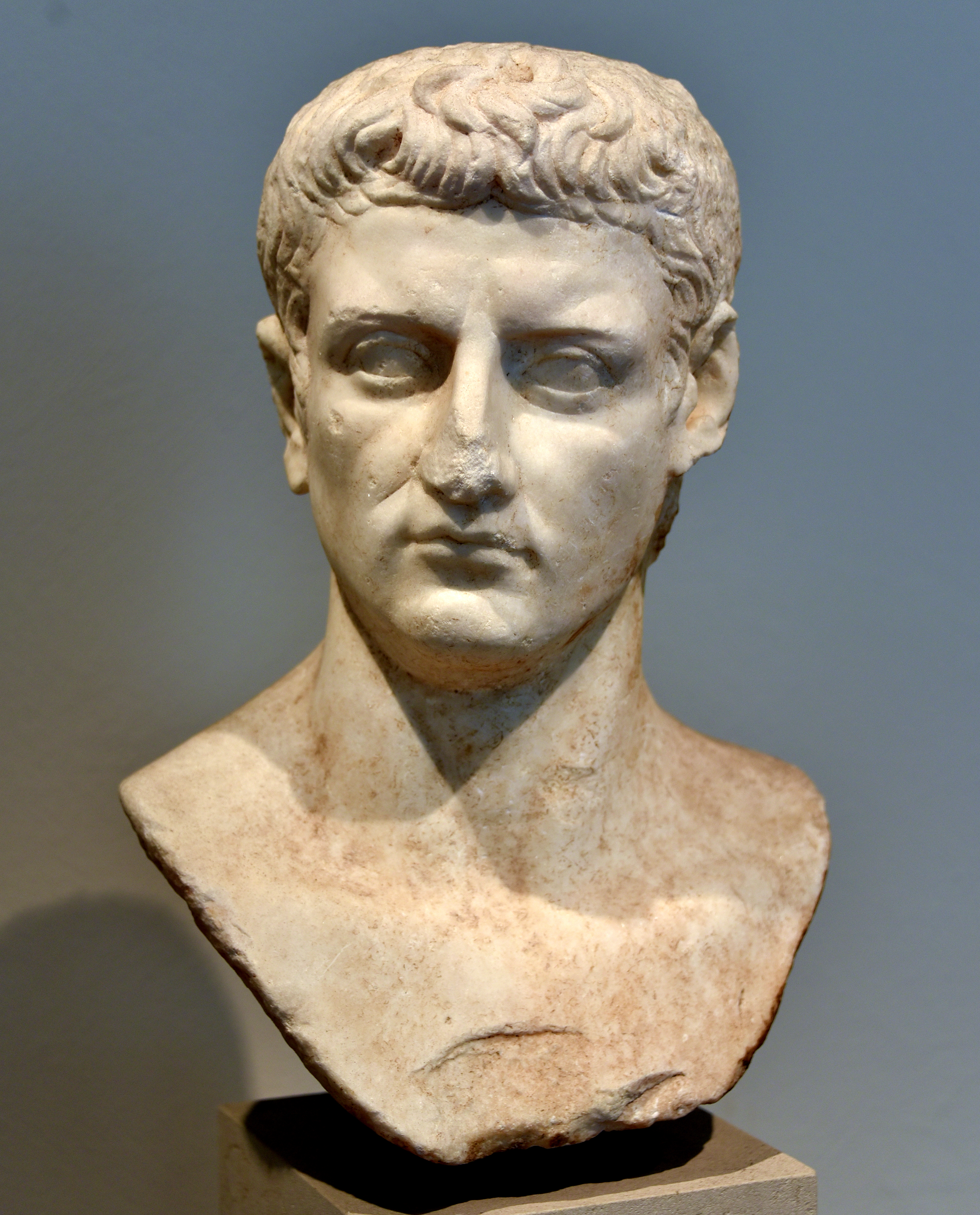
Portrait of Claudius, Altes Museum, Berlin

Claudius was a younger brother of Germanicus, and had long been considered a weakling and a fool by the rest of his family. The Praetorian Guard, however, acclaimed him as emperor. Claudius was neither paranoid like his uncle Tiberius, nor insane like his nephew Caligula, and was therefore able to administer the Empire with reasonable ability. He improved the bureaucracy and streamlined the citizenship and senatorial rolls. He ordered the construction of a winter port at Ostia Antica for Rome, thereby providing a place for grain from other parts of the Empire to be brought in inclement weather.

Claudius ordered the suspension of further attacks across the Rhine, setting what was to become the permanent limit of the Empire's expansion in that direction. In 43, he resumed the Roman conquest of Britannia that Julius Caesar had begun in the 50s BC, and incorporated more Eastern provinces into the empire.

In his own family life, Claudius was less successful. His wife Messalina cuckolded him; when he found out, he had her executed and married his niece, Agrippina the Younger. She, along with several of his freedmen, held an inordinate amount of power over him, and although there are conflicting accounts about his death, she may very well have poisoned him in 54. Claudius was deified later that year. The death of Claudius paved the way for Agrippina's own son, the 17-year-old Lucius Domitius Nero.

=== Nero (54–68) ===
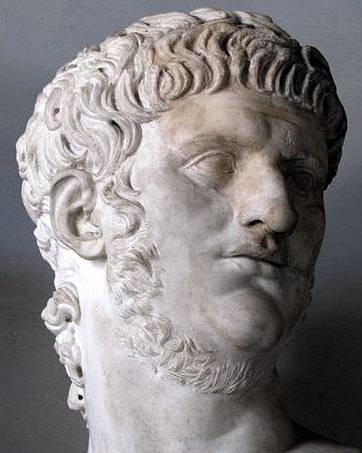
Portrait of Nero, Capitoline Museums

Nero ruled from 54 to 68. During his rule, Nero focused much of his attention on diplomacy, trade, and increasing the cultural capital of the empire. He ordered the building of theatres and promoted athletic games. His reign included the Roman–Parthian War (a successful war and negotiated peace with the Parthian Empire (58–63)), the suppression of a revolt led by Boudica in Britannia (60–61) and the improvement of cultural ties with Greece. However, he was egotistical and had severe troubles with his mother, who he felt was controlling and overbearing. After several attempts to kill her, he finally had her stabbed to death. He believed himself a god and decided to build an opulent palace for himself. The so-called Domus Aurea, meaning golden house in Latin, was constructed atop the burnt remains of Rome after the Great Fire of Rome (64). Because of the convenience of this many believe that Nero was ultimately responsible for the fire, spawning the legend of him fiddling while Rome burned which is almost certainly untrue. The Domus Aurea was a colossal feat of construction that covered a huge space and demanded new methods of construction in order to hold up the golden, jewel-encrusted ceilings. By this time Nero was hugely unpopular despite his attempts to blame the Christians for most of his regime's problems.

A military coup drove Nero into hiding. Facing execution at the hands of the Roman Senate, he reportedly committed suicide in 68. According to Cassius Dio, Nero's last words were "Jupiter, what an artist perishes in me!"

== Year of the Four Emperors (68–69) ==
Since he had no heir, Nero's suicide was followed by a brief period of civil war, known as the "Year of the Four Emperors". Between June 68 and December 69, Rome witnessed the successive rise and fall of Galba, Otho and Vitellius until the final accession of Vespasian, first ruler of the Flavian dynasty. The military and political anarchy created by this civil war had serious implications, such as the outbreak of the Batavian rebellion. These events showed that a military power alone could create an emperor. Augustus had established a standing army, where individual soldiers served under the same military governors over an extended period of time. The consequence was that the soldiers in the provinces developed a degree of loyalty to their commanders, which they did not have for the emperor. Thus the Empire was, in a sense, a union of inchoate principalities, which could have disintegrated at any time.

Through his sound fiscal policy, the emperor Vespasian was able to build up a surplus in the treasury, and began construction on the Colosseum. Titus, Vespasian's son and successor, quickly proved his merit, although his short reign was marked by disaster, including the eruption of Mount Vesuvius in Pompeii. He held the opening ceremonies in the still unfinished Colosseum, but died in 81. His brother Domitian succeeded him. Having exceedingly poor relations with the Senate, Domitian was murdered in September 96.

== Flavian dynasty (69–96) ==
The Flavians, although a relatively short-lived dynasty, helped restore stability to an empire on its knees. Although all three have been criticised, especially based on their more centralised style of rule, they issued reforms that created a stable enough empire to last well into the 3rd century. However, their background as a military dynasty led to further marginalisation of the Roman Senate, and a conclusive move away from princeps, or first citizen, and toward imperator, or emperor.

=== Vespasian (69–79) ===
Vespasian was a remarkably successful Roman general who had been given rule over much of the eastern part of the Roman Empire. He had supported the imperial claims of Galba, after whose death Vespasian became a major contender for the throne. Following the suicide of Otho, Vespasian was able to take control of Rome's winter grain supply in Egypt, placing him in a good position to defeat his remaining rival, Vitellius. On 20 December 69, some of Vespasian's partisans were able to occupy Rome. Vitellius was murdered by his own troops and, the next day, Vespasian, then sixty years old, was confirmed as emperor by the Senate.

Although Vespasian was considered an autocrat by the Senate, he mostly continued the weakening of that body begun in the reign of Tiberius. The degree of the Senate's subservience can be seen from the post-dating of his accession to power, by the Senate, to 1 July, when his troops proclaimed him emperor, instead of 21 December, when the Senate confirmed his appointment. Another example was his assumption of the censorship in 73, giving him power over the make up of the Senate. He used that power to expel dissident senators. At the same time, he increased the number of senators from 200 (at that low level because of the actions of Nero and the year of crisis that followed), to 1,000; most of the new senators came not from Rome but from Italy and the urban centres within the western provinces.

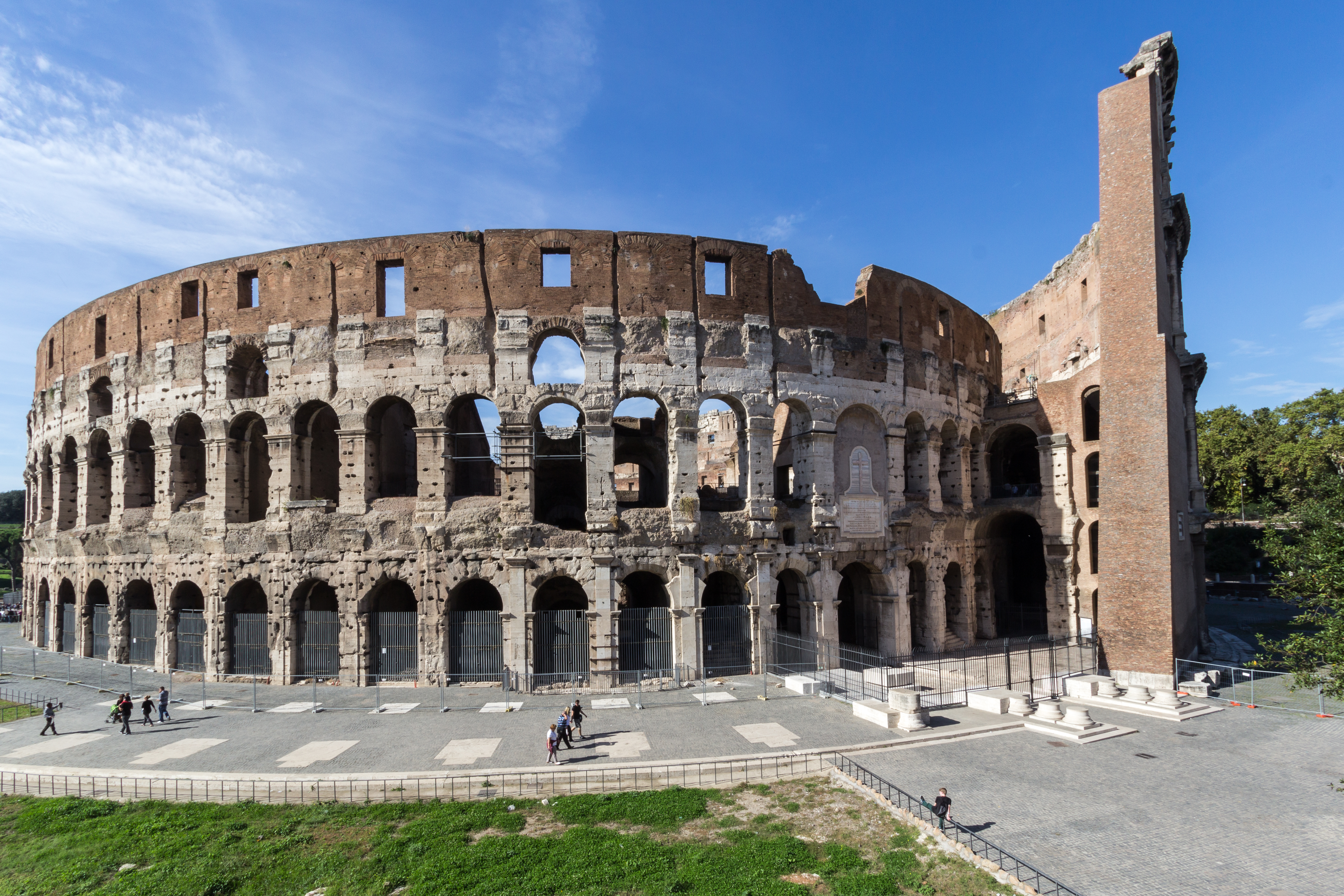
Vespasian commissioned the Colosseum in Rome.

Vespasian was able to liberate Rome from the financial burdens placed upon it by Nero's excesses and the civil wars. To do this, he not only increased taxes, but created new forms of taxation. Also, through his power as censor, he was able to carefully examine the fiscal status of every city and province, many paying taxes based upon information and structures more than a century old. Through this sound fiscal policy, he was able to build up a surplus in the treasury and embark on public works projects. It was he who first commissioned the Amphitheatrum Flavium (Colosseum); he also built the Forum of Vespasian, whose centrepiece was the Temple of Peace. In addition, he allotted sizeable subsidies to the arts, and created a chair of rhetoric at Rome.

Vespasian was also an effective emperor for the provinces, having posts all across the empire, both east and west. In the west he gave considerable favouritism to Hispania (the Iberian Peninsula, comprising modern Spain and Portugal) in which he granted Latin Rights to over three hundred towns and cities, promoting a new era of urbanisation throughout the western (formerly barbarian) provinces. Through the additions he made to the Senate he allowed greater influence of the provinces in the Senate, helping to promote unity in the empire. He also extended the borders of the empire, mostly done to help strengthen the frontier defences, one of Vespasian's main goals.

The crisis of 69 had wrought havoc on the army. One of the most marked problems had been the support lent by provincial legions to men who supposedly represented the best will of their province. This was mostly caused by the placement of native auxiliary units in the areas they were recruited in, a practice Vespasian stopped; he mixed auxiliary units with men from other areas of the empire or moved the units away from where they were recruited. Also, to reduce further the chances of another military coup, he broke up the legions and, instead of placing them in singular concentrations, spread them along the border. Perhaps the most important military reform he undertook was the extension of legion recruitment from exclusively Italy to Gaul and Hispania, in line with the Romanisation of those areas.

=== Titus (79–81) ===
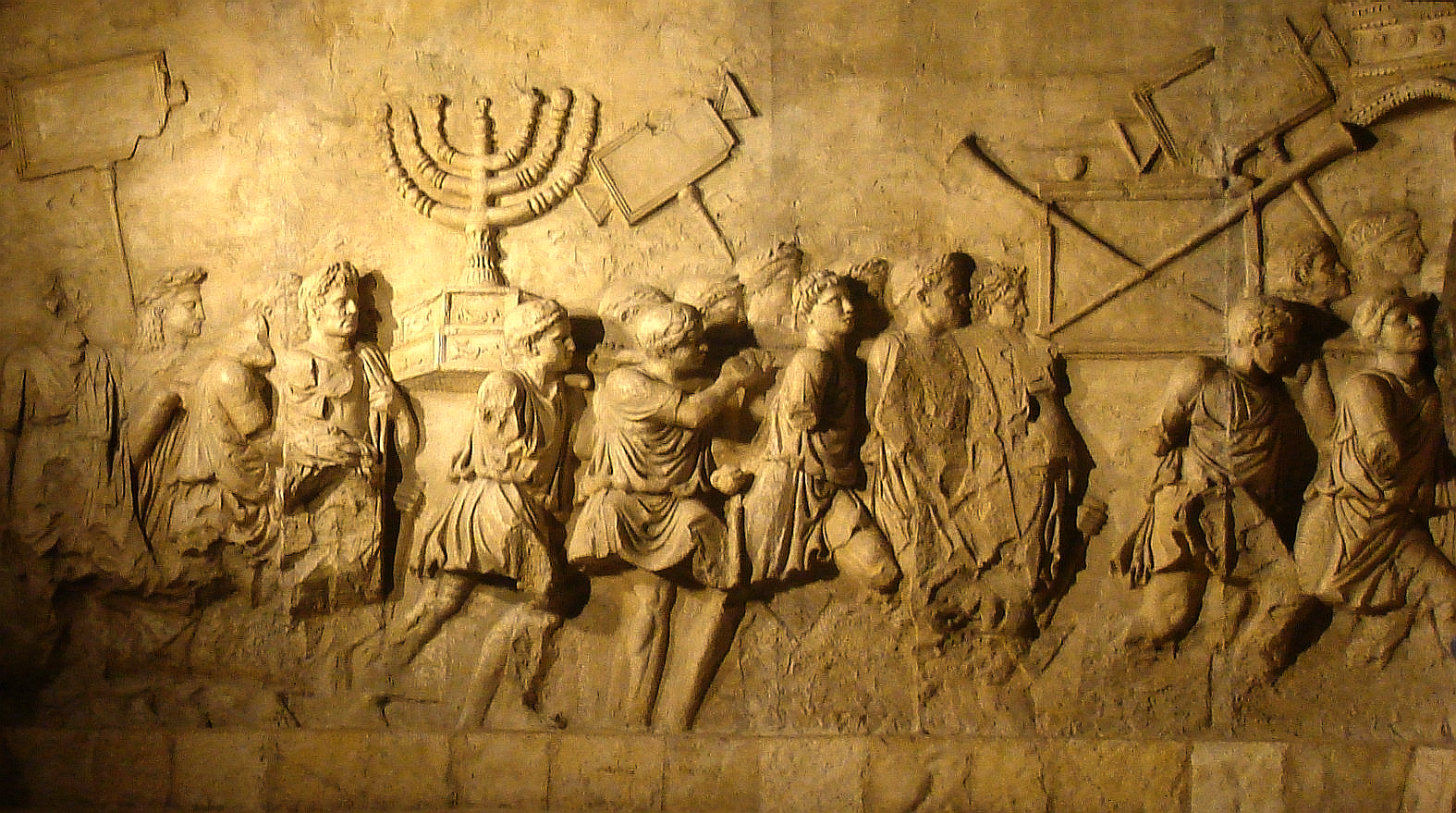
Titus's triumph after the First Jewish-Roman War was celebrated with the Arch of Titus in Rome, which shows the treasures taken from the Temple

Titus, the eldest son of Vespasian, had been groomed to rule. He had served as an effective general under his father, helping to secure the east and eventually taking over the command of Roman armies in Syria and Iudaea, quelling a significant First Jewish–Roman War at the time. He shared the consulship for several years with his father and received the best tutelage. Although there was some trepidation when he took office because of his known dealings with some of the less respectable elements of Roman society, he quickly proved his merit, even recalling many exiled by his father as a show of good faith.

However, his short reign was marked by disaster: in 79, Mount Vesuvius erupted in Pompeii, and in 80, a fire destroyed much of Rome. His generosity in rebuilding after these tragedies made him very popular. Titus was very proud of his work on the vast amphitheatre begun by his father. He held the opening ceremonies in the still unfinished edifice during the year 80, celebrating with a lavish show that featured 100 gladiators and lasted 100 days. Titus died in 81 at the age of 41 of what is presumed to be illness; it was rumoured that his brother Domitian murdered him in order to become his successor, although these claims have little merit. Whatever the case, he was greatly mourned and missed.

=== Domitian (81–96) ===
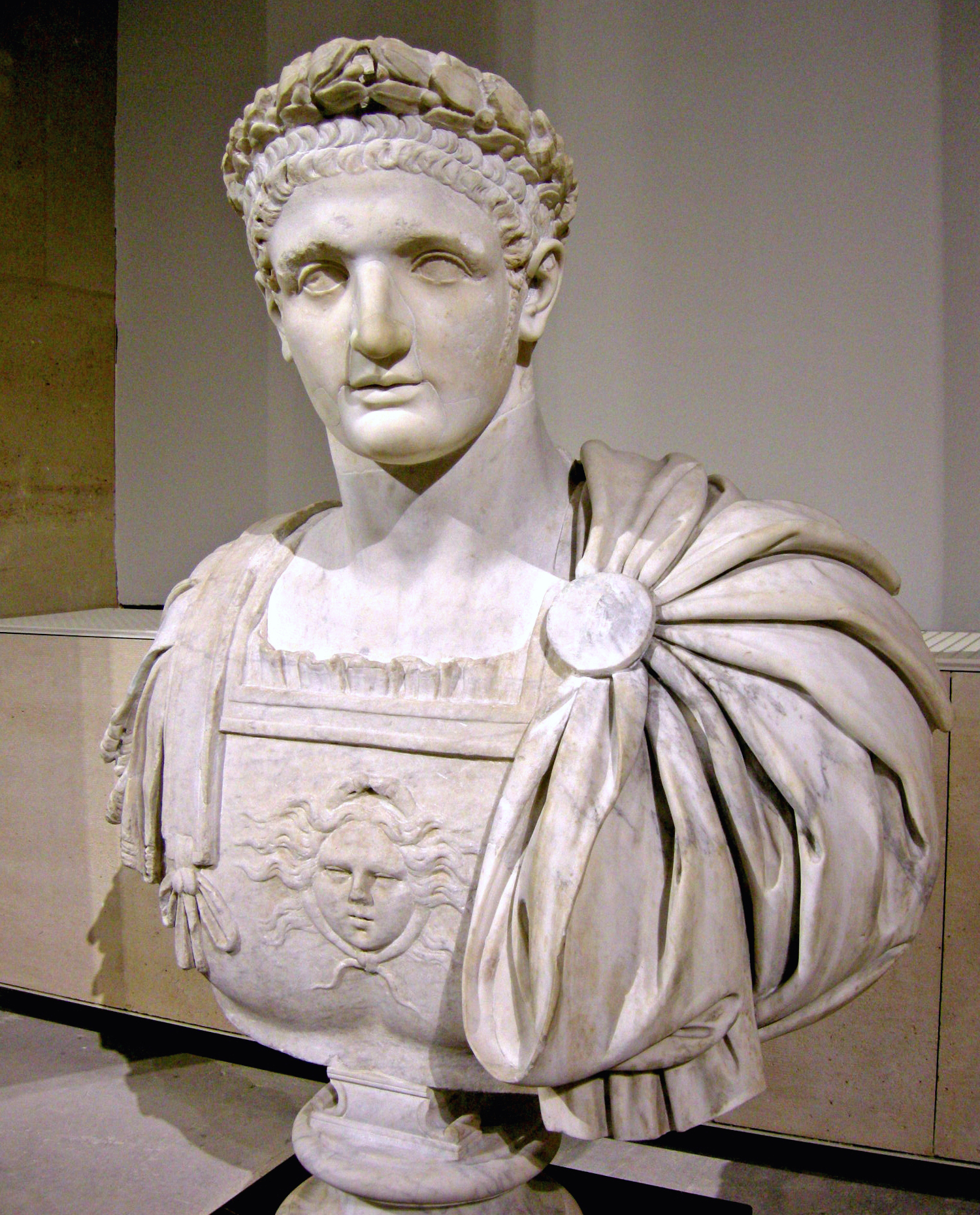
Domitian bust in the Louvre, Paris

All of the Flavians had rather poor relations with the Senate due to their autocratic rule; however, Domitian was the only one who encountered significant problems. His continuous control as consul and censor throughout his rule—the former his father shared in much the same way as his Julio-Claudian forerunners, the latter presented difficulty even to obtain—were unheard of. In addition, he often appeared in full military regalia as an imperator, an affront to the idea of what the Principate-era emperor's power was based upon: the emperor as the princeps. His reputation in the Senate aside, he kept the people of Rome happy through various measures, including donations to every resident of Rome, wild spectacles in the newly finished Colosseum, and the continuation of the public works projects of his father and brother. He also apparently had the good fiscal sense of his father; although he spent lavishly, his successors came to power with a well-endowed treasury. Domitian repelled the Dacians in his Dacian War; the Dacians had sought to conquer Moesia, south of the Danube in the Roman Balkans.

Toward the end of his reign Domitian became extremely paranoid, which probably had its roots in the treatment he received by his father: although given significant responsibility, he was never trusted with anything important without supervision. This flowered into the severe and perhaps pathological repercussions following the short-lived rebellion in 89 of Lucius Antonius Saturninus, a governor and commander in Germania Superior. Domitian's paranoia led to a large number of arrests, executions, and seizures of property (which might help explain his ability to spend so lavishly). Eventually it reached the point where even his closest advisers and family members lived in fear. This led to his murder in 96, orchestrated by his enemies in the Senate, Stephanus (the steward of the deceased Julia Flavia), members of the Praetorian Guard and the empress Domitia Longina.

== Five Good Emperors (96–180) ==
The next century came to be known as the period of the "Five Good Emperors", in which the succession was peaceful and the Empire prosperous. The emperors of this period were Nerva (96–98), Trajan (98–117), Hadrian (117–138), Antoninus Pius (138–161) and Marcus Aurelius (161–180), each one adopted by his predecessor as his successor during the former's lifetime. While their respective choices of successor were based upon the merits of the individual men they selected rather than dynastic, it has been argued that the real reason for the lasting success of the adoptive scheme of succession lay more with the fact that none but the last had a natural heir.

The last two emperors of the "Five Good Emperors" and Commodus are also called Antonines.

=== Nerva (96–98) ===
After his accession, Nerva set a new tone: he released those imprisoned for treason, banned future prosecutions for treason, restored much confiscated property, and involved the Roman Senate in his rule. He probably did so as a means to remain relatively popular and therefore alive, but this did not completely aid him. Support for Domitian in the army remained strong, and in October 97 the Praetorian Guard laid siege to the Imperial Palace on the Palatine Hill and took Nerva hostage. He was forced to submit to their demands, agreeing to hand over those responsible for Domitian's death and even giving a speech thanking the rebellious Praetorians. Nerva then adopted Trajan, a commander of the armies on the German frontier, as his successor shortly thereafter in order to bolster his own rule. Casperius Aelianus, the Guard Prefect responsible for the mutiny against Nerva, was later executed under Trajan.

=== Trajan (98–117) ===
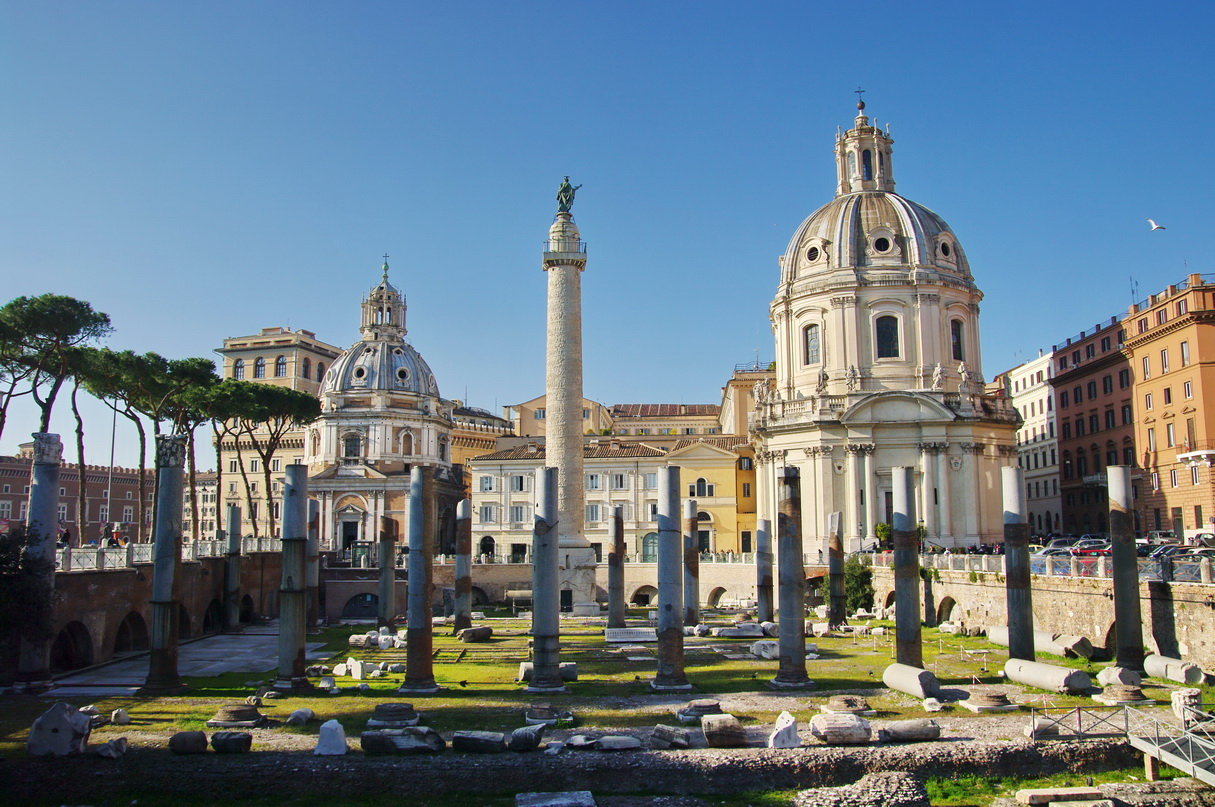
Trajan's Column in Trajan's Forum, marble with stone-carved reliefs that show various scenes depicting events of Trajan's Dacian Wars

Upon his accession to the throne, Trajan prepared and launched a carefully planned military invasion in Dacia, a region north of the lower Danube whose inhabitants the Dacians had long been an opponent to Rome. In 101, Trajan personally crossed the Danube and defeated the armies of the Dacian king Decebalus at the Battle of Tapae. The emperor decided not to press on towards a final conquest as his armies needed reorganisation, but he did impose very hard peace conditions on the Dacians. At Rome, Trajan was received as a hero and he took the name of Dacicus, a title that appears on his coinage of this period. (Note: "Although the Dacians had been defeated, the emperor postponed the final siege for the conquering of Sarmizegetuza because his armies needed reorganisation. Trajan imposed on the Dacians very hard peace conditions: Decebalus had to renounce claim to some regions of his kingdom, including Banat, Tara Hategului, Oltenia, and Muntenia in the area south-west of Transylvania. He had also to surrender all the Roman deserters and all his war machines. At Rome, Trajan was received as a winner and he took the name of Dacicus, a title that appears on his coinage of this period. At the beginning of the year AD 103, there were minted coins with the inscription: IMP NERVA TRAIANVS AVG GER DACICVS.") Decebalus complied with the terms for a time, but before long he began inciting revolt. In 105 Trajan once again invaded and after a yearlong invasion ultimately defeated the Dacians by conquering their capital, Sarmizegetusa Regia. King Decebalus, cornered by the Roman cavalry, eventually committed suicide rather than being captured and humiliated in Rome. The conquest of Dacia was a major accomplishment for Trajan, who ordered 123 days of celebration throughout the empire. He also constructed Trajan's Column in the middle of Trajan's Forum in Rome to glorify the victory.

In 112, Trajan was provoked by the decision of Osroes I to put the latter’s own nephew Axidares on the throne of the Kingdom of Armenia. The Arsacid dynasty of Armenia was a branch of the Parthian royal family established in 54. Since then, the two great empires had shared hegemony of Armenia. The encroachment on the traditional Roman sphere of influence by Osroes ended the peace which had lasted for some 50 years.

The maximum extent of the Roman Empire under Trajan (117)

Trajan first invaded Armenia. He deposed the king and annexed it to the Roman Empire. Then he turned south into Parthian territory in Mesopotamia, taking the cities of Babylon, Seleucia and finally the capital of Ctesiphon in 116, while suppressing the Kitos War, a Jewish uprising across the eastern provinces. He continued southward to the Persian Gulf, whence he took Mesopotamia as a new province of the empire and lamented that he was too old to follow in the steps of Alexander the Great and continue his invasion eastward.

But he did not stop there. In 116, he captured the great city of Susa. He deposed the emperor Osroes I and put his own puppet ruler Parthamaspates on the throne. Not until the reign of Heraclius would the Roman army push so far to the east, and Roman territory never again reached so far eastward. During his rule, the Roman Empire reached its greatest extent; it was quite possible for a Roman to travel from Britain to the Persian Gulf without leaving Roman territory.

=== Hadrian (117–138) ===
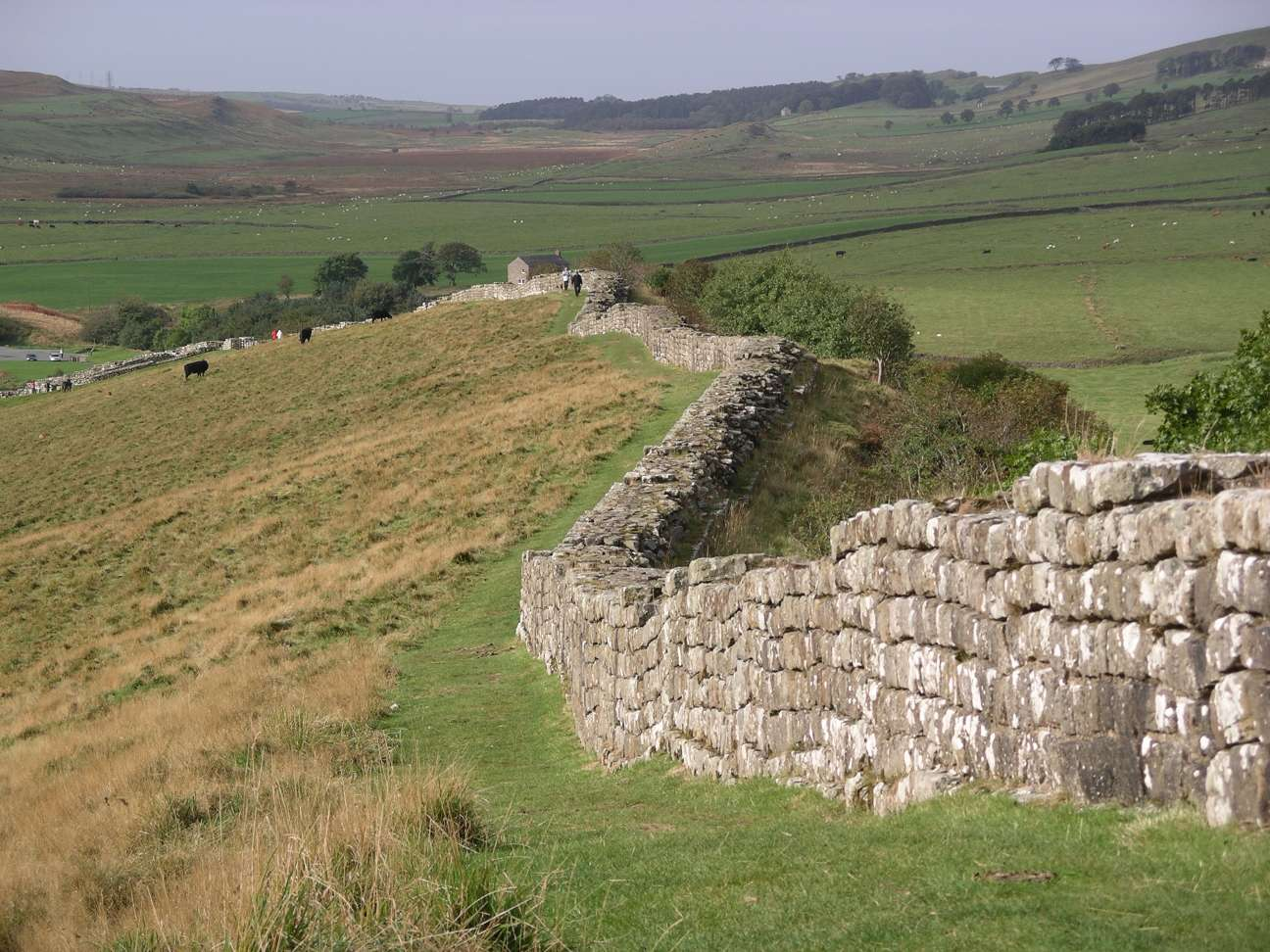
Parts of Hadrian's Wall in Britain remain to this day.

Despite his own excellence as a military administrator, Hadrian's reign was marked more by the defence of the empire's vast territories, rather than major military conflicts. He surrendered Trajan's conquests in Mesopotamia, considering them to be indefensible. There was almost a war with Vologases III of Parthia around 121, but the threat was averted when Hadrian succeeded in negotiating a peace. Hadrian's army crushed the Bar Kokhba revolt, a massive Jewish uprising in Judea (132–135).

Hadrian was the first emperor to extensively tour the provinces, donating money for local construction projects as he went. In Britain, he ordered the construction of a wall, the famous Hadrian's Wall as well as various other such defences in Germania and North Africa. His domestic policy was one of relative peace and prosperity.

=== Antoninus Pius (138–161) ===
Antoninus Pius's reign was comparatively peaceful; there were several military disturbances throughout the Empire in his time, in Mauretania, Judaea, and amongst the Brigantes in Britain, but none of them are considered serious. The unrest in Britain is believed to have led to the construction of the Antonine Wall from the Firth of Forth to the Firth of Clyde, although it was soon abandoned.

=== Marcus Aurelius and Lucius Verus (161–180) ===
Germanic tribes and other people launched many raids along the long north European border, particularly into Gaul and across the Danube; Germans, in turn, may have been under attack from more warlike tribes farther east, driving them into the empire. His campaigns against them are commemorated on the Column of Marcus Aurelius.

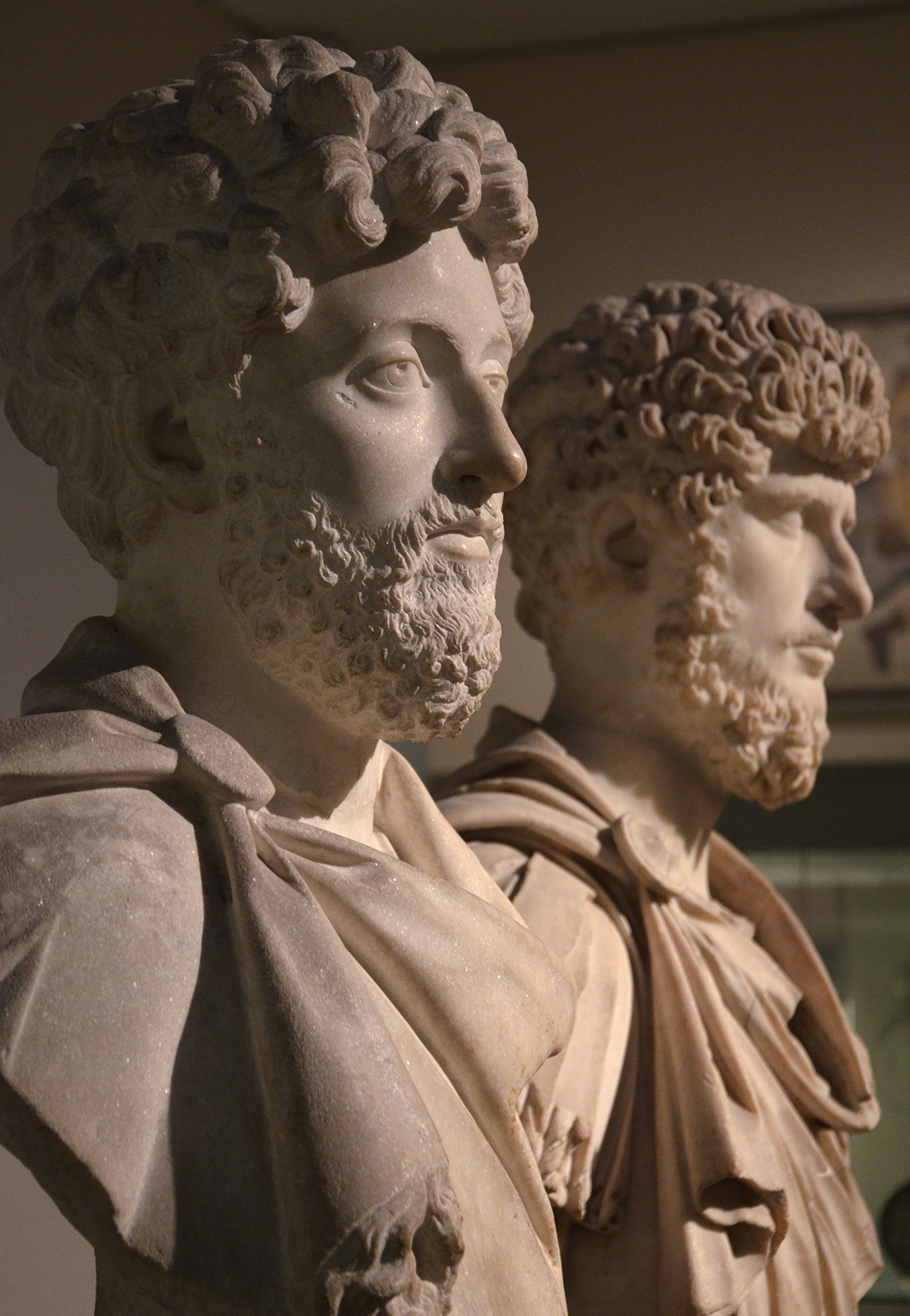
Busts of the co-emperors Marcus Aurelius (left) and Lucius Verus (right), British Museum

In Asia, a revitalised Parthian Empire renewed its assault. Marcus Aurelius sent his co-emperor Lucius Verus to command the legions in the East. Lucius was authoritative enough to command the full loyalty of the troops, but already powerful enough that he had little incentive to overthrow Marcus. The plan succeeded—Verus remained loyal until his death, while on campaign, in 169.

In 175, while on campaign in northern Germany in the Marcomannic Wars, Marcus was forced to contend with a rebellion by Avidius Cassius, a general who had been an officer during the wars against Persia. Cassius proclaimed himself Roman Emperor and took the provinces of Egypt and Syria as his part of the Empire. It is said that Cassius had revolted as he had heard word that Marcus was dead. After three months Cassius was assassinated and Marcus restored the eastern part of the Empire.

In the last years of his life Marcus, a philosopher as well as an emperor, wrote his book of Stoic philosophy known as the Meditations. The book has since been hailed as Marcus' great contribution to philosophy.

When Marcus died in 180 the throne passed to his son Commodus, who had been elevated to the rank of co-emperor in 177. This ended the succession plan of the previous four emperors where the emperor would adopt his successor, although Marcus was the first emperor since Vespasian to have a natural son that could succeed him, which probably was the reason he allowed the throne to pass to Commodus and not adopt a successor from outside his family.

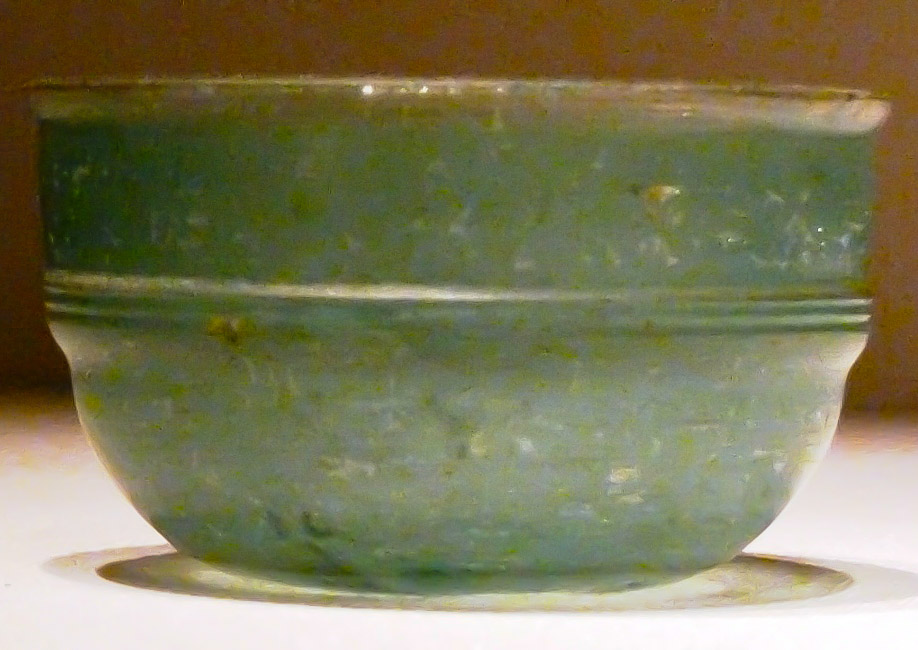
Green Roman glass cup unearthed from an Eastern Han Dynasty (AD 25–220) tomb, Guangxi, China

It is possible that an alleged Roman embassy from "Daqin" that arrived in Eastern Han China in 166 via a Roman maritime route into the South China Sea, landing at Jiaozhou (northern Vietnam) and bearing gifts for the Emperor Huan of Han (r. 146–168), was sent by Marcus Aurelius, or his predecessor Antoninus Pius (the confusion stems from the transliteration of their names as "Andun", Chinese: 安敦). The embassy was perhaps simply a group of Roman merchants, not official diplomats. Other Roman embassies of the 3rd century supposedly visited China by sailing along the same maritime route. These were preceded by the appearance of Roman glasswares in Chinese tombs, the earliest piece found at Guangzhou (along the coast of the South China Sea) and dating to the 1st century BC. The earliest Roman coins found in China date to the 4th century AD and appear to have come by way of the Silk Road through Central Asia. However, Roman golden medallions from the reign of Antoninus Pius, and possibly his successor Marcus Aurelius, have been discovered at Óc Eo (in southern Vietnam), which was then part of the kingdom of Funan near Chinese-controlled Jiaozhi (northern Vietnam) and the region where Chinese historical texts claim the Romans first landed before venturing further into China to conduct diplomacy. (Note: For further information on the Kingdom of Funan and discoveries at Oc Eo, see Milton Osborne's work.) Furthermore, in his Geography (c. AD 150), Ptolemy described the location of the Golden Chersonese, now known as the Malay Peninsula, and beyond this a trading port called Kattigara. Ferdinand von Richthofen assumed this as Hanoi, yet the Roman and Mediterranean artefacts found at Óc Eo suggest this location instead.

== Commodus and the Year of the Five Emperors (180–193) ==
=== Commodus ===
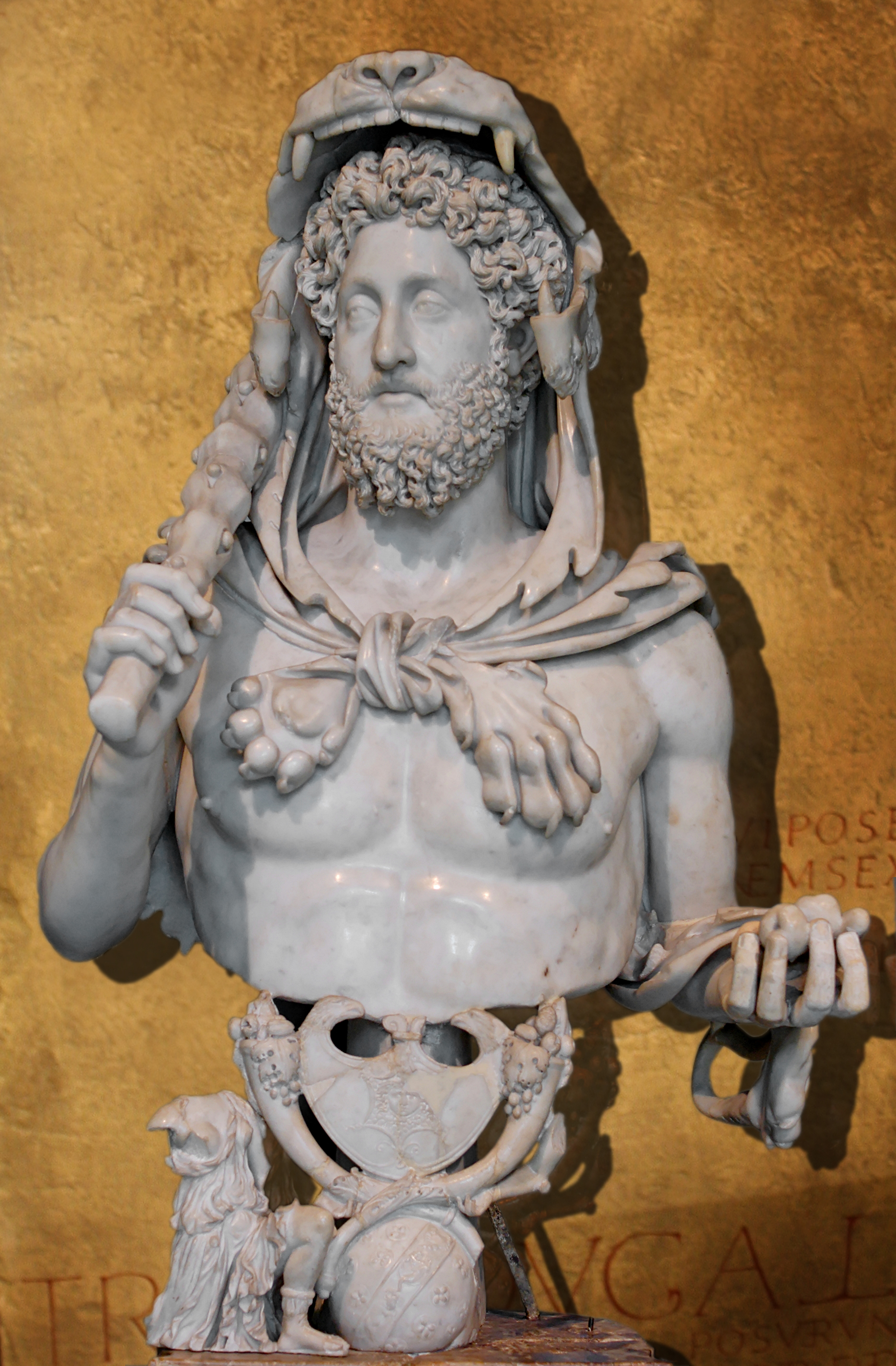
A bust of Commodus, depicting him as the legendary Heracles (i.e. Hercules) wearing the skins of the Nemean lion

The period of the "Five Good Emperors" was brought to an end by the reign of Commodus from 180 to 192. Commodus was the son of Marcus Aurelius, making him the first direct successor in a century, breaking the scheme of adoptive successors that had worked so well. He was co-emperor with his father from 177. When he became sole emperor upon the death of his father in 180, it was at first seen as a hopeful sign by the people of the Roman Empire. Nevertheless, as generous and magnanimous as his father was, Commodus was just the opposite. In The Decline and Fall of the Roman Empire, Edward Gibbon noted that Commodus at first ruled the Empire well. However, after an assassination attempt involving a conspiracy by certain members of his family, Commodus became paranoid and slipped into insanity. The Pax Romana, or "Roman Peace", ended with the reign of Commodus. One could argue that the assassination attempt began the long decline of the Roman Empire. When Commodus' behaviour became increasingly erratic throughout the early 190s, a plot carried out by the Praetorian prefect Quintus Aemilius Laetus, Commodus' mistress Marcia, and his chamberlain Eclectus led to the assassination of the emperor on 31 December 192. Pertinax is thought to have been implicated in the conspiracy.

=== Pertinax ===
After the murder had been carried out, Pertinax, who was serving as urban prefect at this time, was hurried to the Praetorian Camp and proclaimed emperor the following morning. His short reign (86 days) was an uneasy one. He attempted to emulate the restrained practices of Marcus Aurelius, and made an effort to reform the welfare programme for poor children but he faced antagonism from many quarters.

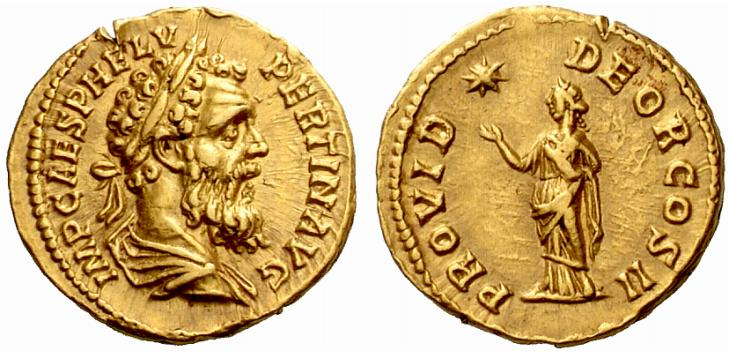
Roman aureus struck under the rule of Pertinax. Inscription: IMP. CAES. P. HELV. PERTIN. AVG. / PROVIDentia DEORum COnSul II

His monetary reform was far-sighted, but would not survive his death. He attempted to impose stricter military discipline upon the pampered Praetorians. In early March he narrowly averted one conspiracy by a group to replace him with the consul Quintus Pompeius Sosius Falco while he was in Ostia inspecting the arrangements for grain shipments. The plot was betrayed; Falco himself was pardoned but several of the officers behind the coup were executed.

On 28 March 193, Pertinax was at his palace when a contingent of some three hundred soldiers of the Praetorian Guard rushed the gates (two hundred according to Cassius Dio). Sources suggest that they had received only half their promised pay. Neither the guards on duty nor the palace officials chose to resist them. Pertinax sent Laetus to meet them, but he chose to side with the insurgents instead and deserted the emperor. Although advised to flee, he then attempted to reason with them, and was almost successful before being struck down by one of the soldiers. The Praetorian Guards auctioned off the imperial position, which senator Didius Julianus won and became the new emperor.

=== Didius Julianus ===
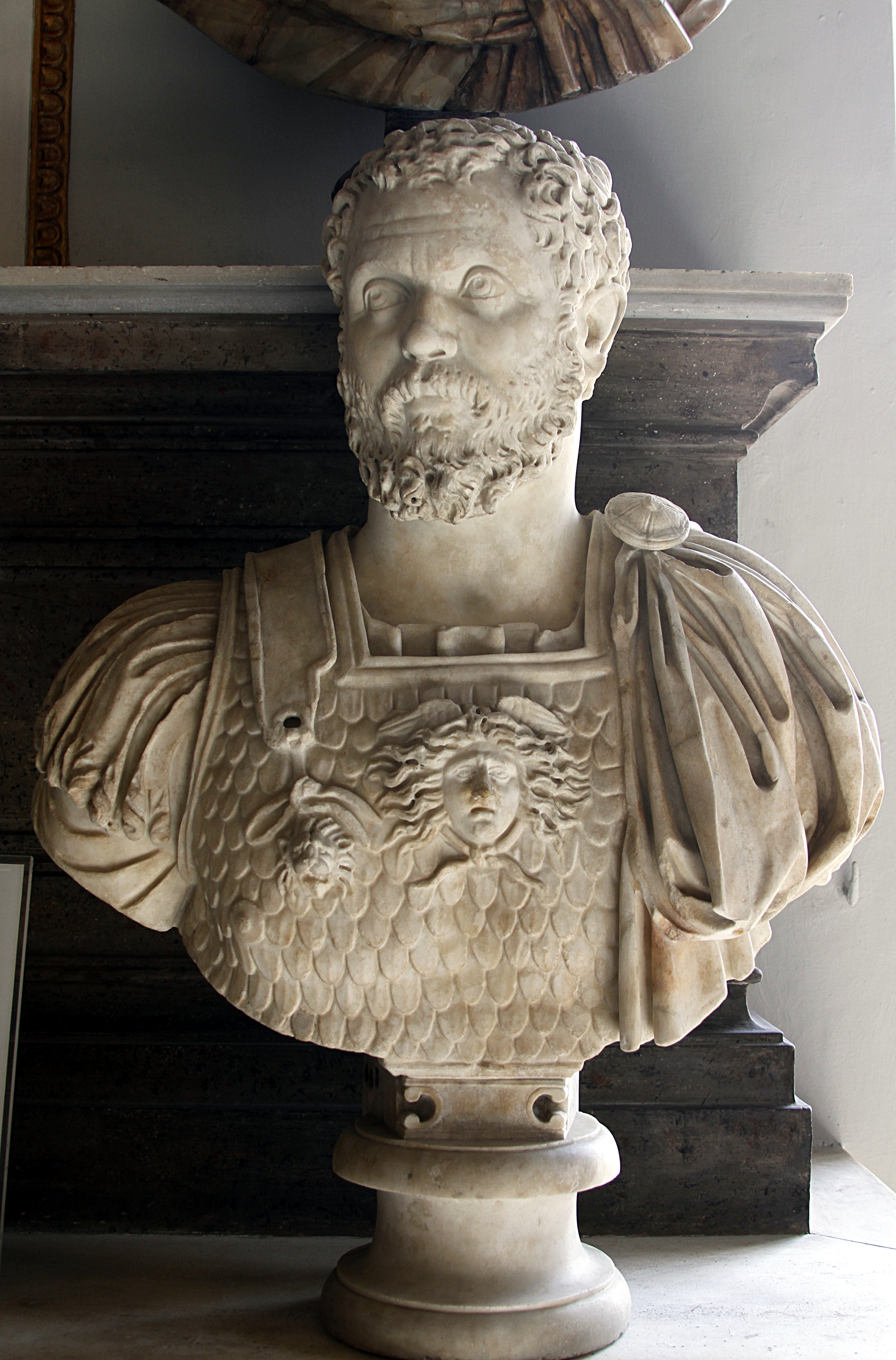
Bust of Clodius Albinus (d. 197), a usurper who was proclaimed emperor after the assassination of Pertinax

Upon his accession, Julianus immediately devalued the Roman currency by decreasing the silver purity of the denarius from 87% to 81.5%. After the initial confusion had subsided, the population did not tamely submit to the dishonour brought upon Rome. Whenever Julianus appeared in public he was saluted with groans, imprecations, and shouts of "robber and parricide." The mob tried to obstruct his progress to the Capitol, and even threw stones. When news of the public anger in Rome spread across the Empire, the generals Pescennius Niger in Syria, Septimius Severus in Pannonia, and Clodius Albinus in Britain, each having three legions under his command, refused to recognise the authority of Julianus. Julianus declared Severus a public enemy because he was the nearest of the three and, therefore, the most dangerous foe. Deputies were sent from the Senate to persuade the soldiers to abandon him; a new general was nominated to supersede him, and a centurion dispatched to take his life.

The Praetorian Guard, lacking discipline and sunk in debauchery and sloth, were incapable of offering any effectual resistance. Julianus, now desperate, attempted negotiation and offered to share the empire with his rival. Severus ignored these overtures and pressed forward, all Italy declaring for him as he advanced. At last the Praetorians, having received assurances that they would suffer no punishment – provided they surrendered the actual murderers of Pertinax – seized the ringleaders of the conspiracy and reported what they had done to Silius Messala, the consul, by whom the Senate was summoned and informed of the proceedings. Julianus was killed in the palace by a soldier in the third month of his reign (1 June 193). Severus dismissed the Praetorian Guard and executed the soldiers who had killed Pertinax. According to Cassius Dio, who lived in Rome during the period, Julianus's last words were "But what evil have I done? Whom have I killed?" His body was given to his wife and daughter, who buried it in his great-grandfather's tomb by the fifth milestone on the Via Labicana.

== Severan dynasty (193–235) ==
=== Septimius Severus (193–211) ===
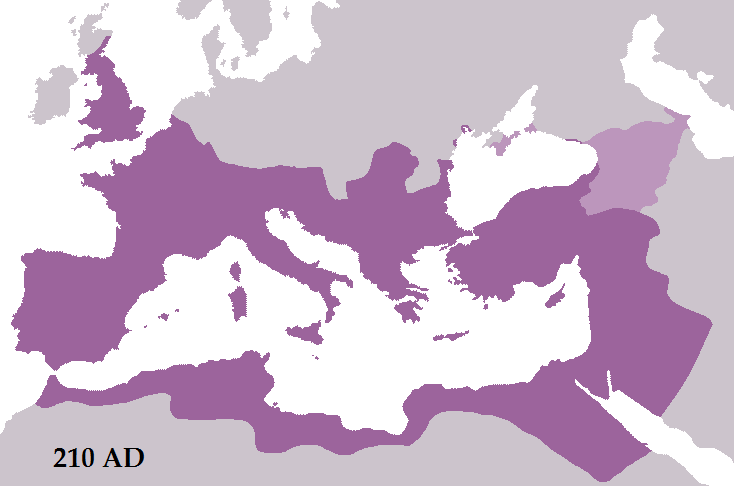
The empire under Septimius Severus (210)

Lucius Septimius Severus was born to a family of Phoenician equestrian rank in the Roman province of Africa proconsularis. He rose through military service to consular rank under the later Antonines. Proclaimed emperor in 193 by his legionaries in Noricum during the political unrest that followed the death of Commodus, he secured sole rule over the empire in 197 after defeating his last rival, Clodius Albinus, at the Battle of Lugdunum. In securing his position as emperor, he founded the Severan dynasty.

Severus fought a successful war against the Parthians and campaigned with success against barbarian incursions in Roman Britain, rebuilding Hadrian's Wall. In Rome, his relations with the Senate were poor, but he was popular with the commoners, as with his soldiers, whose salary he raised. Starting in 197, the influence of his Praetorian prefect Gaius Fulvius Plautianus was a negative influence; the latter was executed in 205. One of Plautianus's successors was the jurist Papinian. Severus continued official persecution of Christians and Jews, as they were the only two groups who would not assimilate their beliefs to the official syncretistic creed. Severus died while campaigning in Britain. He was succeeded by his sons Caracalla and Geta, whom he made his co-Augusti and who reigned under the influence of their mother, Julia Domna.

=== Caracalla and Geta (198–217) ===
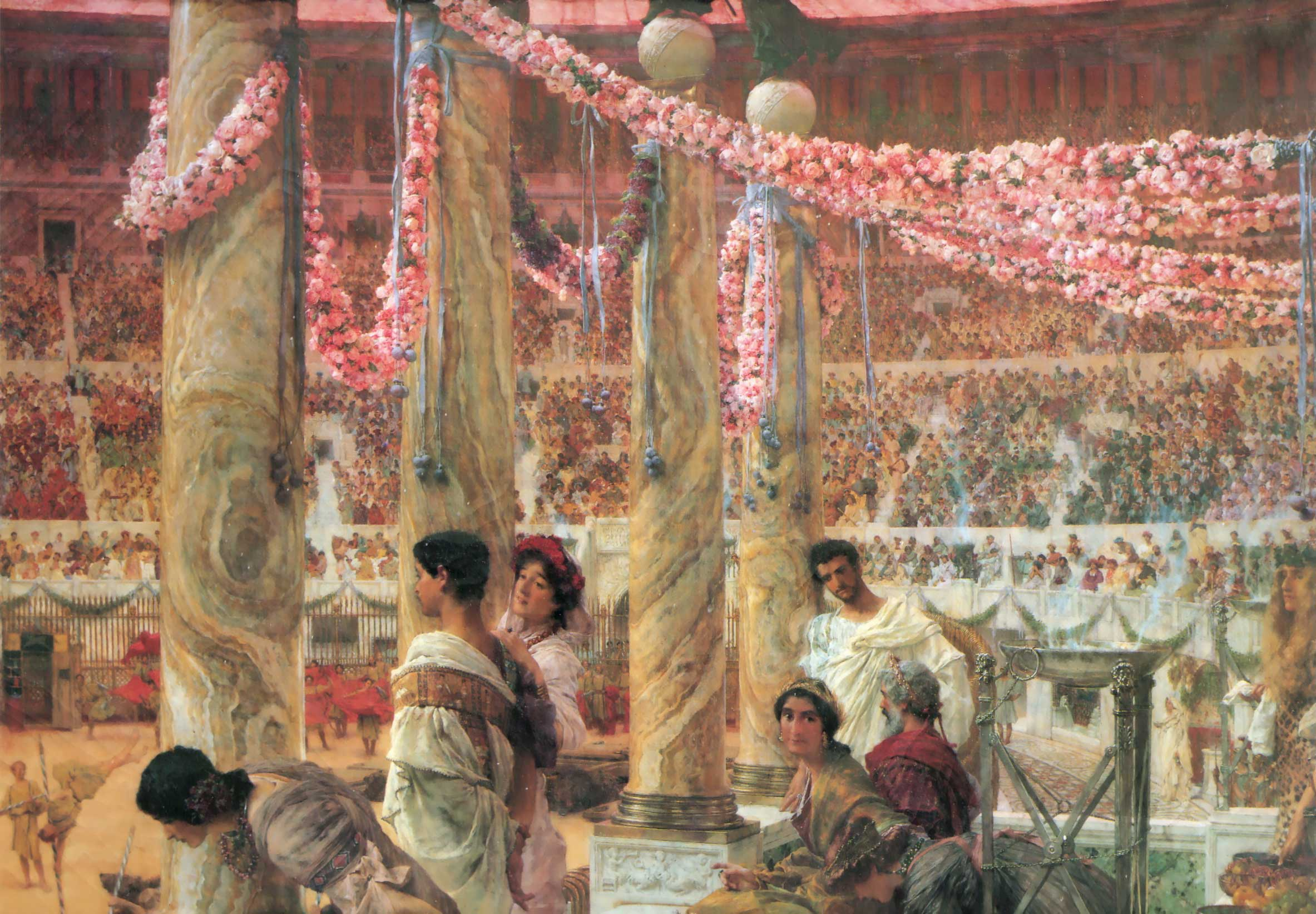
Caracalla and Geta, Lawrence Alma-Tadema (1907).

The eldest son of Severus, Caracalla was born Lucius Septimius Bassianus in Lugdunum, Gaul. "Caracalla" was a nickname referring to the Gallic hooded tunic he habitually wore even when he slept. Before his father's death, Caracalla was proclaimed co-emperor with his father and brother Geta. Conflict between the two culminated in the assassination of the latter. Unlike the much more successful joint reign of Marcus Aurelius and his brother Lucius Verus in the previous century, relations were hostile between the two Severid brothers from childhood. Geta was assassinated in his mother's apartments by order of Caracalla, who thereafter ruled as sole Augustus.

Reigning alone, Caracalla was noted for lavish bribes to the legionaries and unprecedented cruelty, authorising numerous assassinations of perceived enemies and rivals. He campaigned with indifferent success against the Alamanni. The Baths of Caracalla in Rome are the most enduring monument of his rule. His reign was also notable for the Antonine Constitution (Latin: Constitutio Antoniniana), also known as the Edict of Caracalla, which granted Roman citizenship to nearly all freemen throughout the Roman Empire.

He was assassinated while en route to a campaign against the Parthians by the Praetorian Guard.

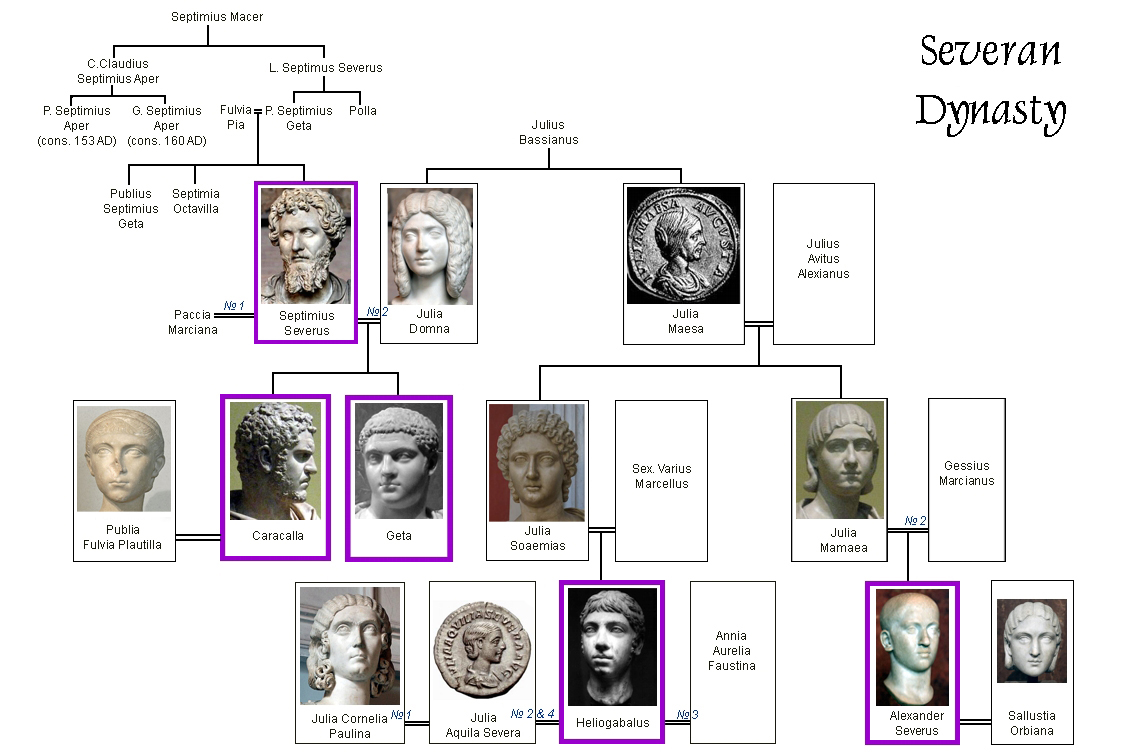
Severan dynasty family tree

=== Interlude: Macrinus and Diadumenian (217–218) ===
Macrinus was born in 164 at Caesarea. Although coming from a humble background that was not dynastically related to the Severan dynasty, he rose through the imperial household until, under the emperor Caracalla, he was made prefect of the Praetorian Guard. On account of the cruelty and treachery of the emperor, Macrinus became involved in a conspiracy to kill him, and ordered the Praetorian Guard to do so. On 8 April 217, Caracalla was assassinated travelling to Carrhae. Three days later, Macrinus was declared Augustus. Diadumenian was the son of Macrinus, born in 208. He was given the title Caesar in 217, when his father became Augustus, and raised to co-Augustus the following year.

His most significant early decision was to make peace with the Parthian Empire, but many thought that the terms were degrading to the Romans. However, his downfall was his refusal to award the pay and privileges promised to the eastern troops by Caracalla. He also kept those forces wintered in Syria, where they became attracted to the young Elagabalus. After months of mild rebellion by the bulk of the army in Syria, Macrinus took his loyal troops to meet the army of Elagabalus near Antioch. Despite a good fight by the Praetorian Guard, his soldiers were defeated. Macrinus managed to escape to Chalcedon, but his authority was lost: he was betrayed and executed after a short reign of just 14 months. After his father's defeat outside Antioch, Diadumenian tried to escape east to Parthia, but was captured and killed.

=== Elagabalus (218–222) ===
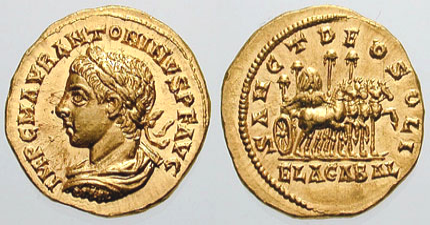
Roman aureus depicting Elagabalus. The reverse commemorates the sun god Elagabal.

Born Varius Avitus Bassianus on 16 May 205, known later as M. Aurelius Antonius, he was appointed at an early age to be priest of the sun god, Elagabalus, represented by a large, dark rock called a baetyl, by which name he is known to historians (his name is sometimes written "Heliogabalus"). He was proclaimed emperor by the troops of Emesa, his hometown, who were instigated to do so by Elagabalus's grandmother, Julia Maesa. She spread a rumour that Elagabalus was the secret son of Caracalla. This revolt spread to the entire Syrian army (which, at the time, was swollen with troops raised by the emperor Caracalla, and not fully loyal to Macrinus), and eventually they were to win the short struggle that followed by defeating Macrinus at a battle just outside Antioch. Elagabalus was then accepted by the Senate, and he began the slow journey to Rome.

His reign in Rome has long been known for outrageousness, although the historical sources are few, and in many cases not to be fully trusted. He is said to have smothered guests at a banquet by flooding the room with rose petals; married his male lover – who was then referred as the 'empress's husband'; and married one of the Vestal Virgins. Some say he was transgender, and one ancient text states that he offered half the empire to the physician who could give him female genitalia.

The running of the Empire during this time was mainly left to his grandmother and mother (Julia Soaemias). Seeing that her grandson's outrageous behaviour could mean the loss of power, Julia Maesa persuaded Elagabalus to accept his cousin Severus Alexander as Caesar (and thus the nominal emperor-to-be). However, Alexander was popular with the troops, who viewed their new emperor with dislike: when Elagabalus, jealous of this popularity, removed the title of Caesar from his nephew, the enraged Praetorian Guard swore to protect him. Elagabalus and his mother were murdered in a Praetorian Guard camp mutiny.

=== Severus Alexander (222–235) ===
Bust of Severus Alexander, the last emperor of the Severan dynasty; Musée Saint-Raymond, Toulouse

Severus Alexander was adopted as son and Caesar by his slightly older and very unpopular cousin, the emperor Elagabalus at the urging of the influential and powerful Julia Maesa — who was grandmother of both cousins and who had arranged for the emperor's acclamation by the Third Legion. On 6 March 222, when Alexander was just fourteen, a rumour went around the city troops that Alexander had been killed, triggering a revolt of the guards that had sworn his safety from Elegabalus and his accession as emperor. The eighteen-year-old Emperor Elagabalus and his mother were both taken from the palace, dragged through the streets, murdered and thrown in the river Tiber by the Praetorian Guard, who then proclaimed Severus Alexander as Augustus.

Ruling from the age of fourteen under the influence of his able mother, Julia Avita Mamaea, Alexander restored, to some extent, the moderation that characterised the rule of Septimius Severus. The rising strength of the Sasanian Empire (226–651) heralded perhaps the greatest external challenge that Rome faced in the 3rd century. His prosecution of the war against a German invasion of Gaul led to his overthrow by the troops he was leading, whose regard the twenty-seven-year-old had lost during the campaign.

== Crisis of the Third Century (235–284) ==
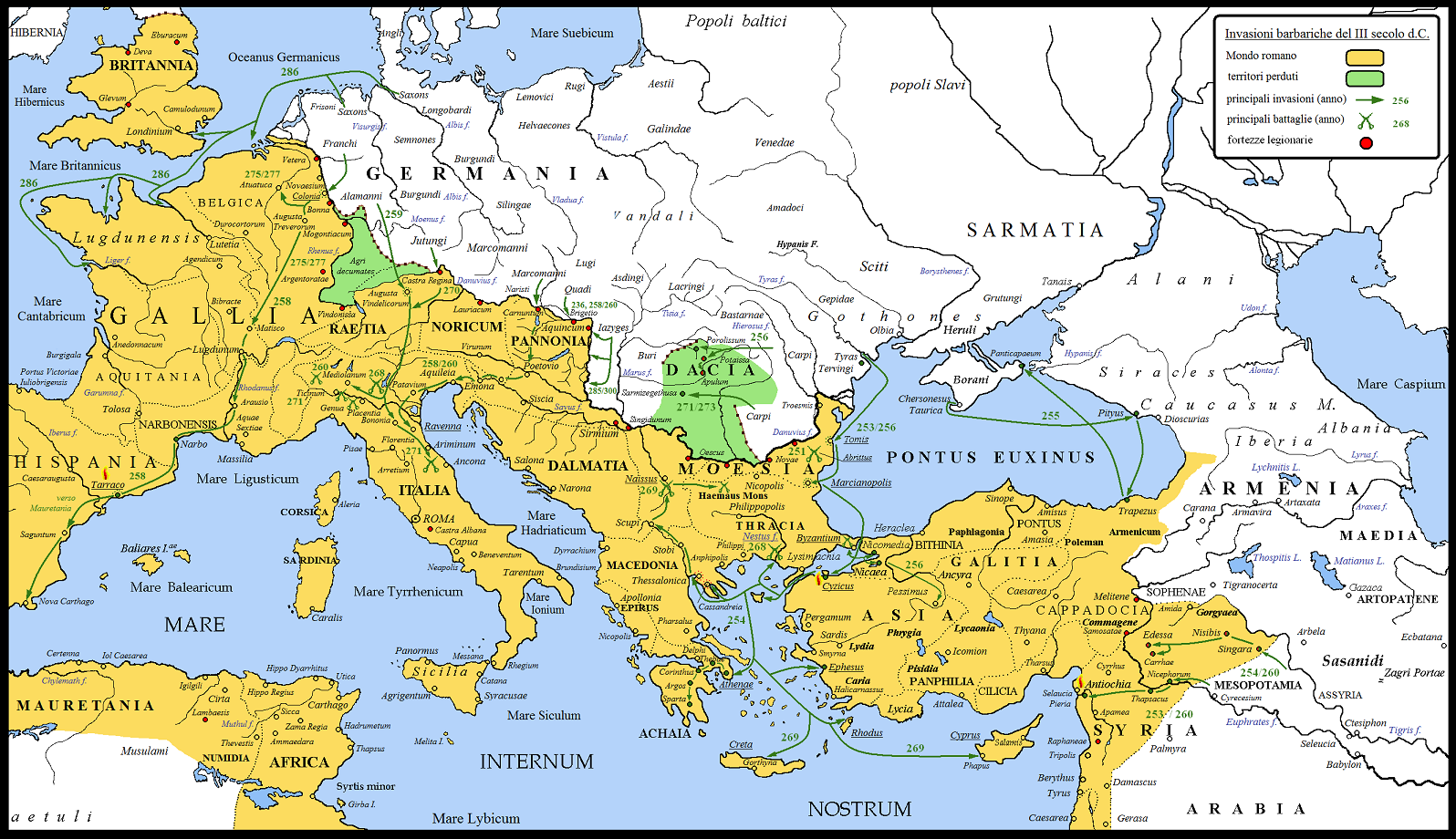
Barbarian invasions of the 3rd century

The situation of the Roman Empire became dire in AD 235, when the emperor Severus Alexander was murdered by his own troops. Many Roman legions had been defeated during a campaign against Germanic peoples raiding across the borders, while the emperor was focused primarily on the dangers from the Sassanid Persian Empire. Leading his troops personally, Alexander resorted to diplomacy and the paying of tribute in an attempt to pacify the Germanic chieftains quickly. According to Herodian this cost him the respect of his troops, who may have felt they should be punishing the tribes who were intruding on Rome's territory. (Note: "The soldiers, however, were not pleased by his action, for the time was passing without profit to them, and Alexander was doing nothing courageous or energetic about the war;...".)

In the years following the emperor's death, generals of the Roman army fought each other for control of the Empire and neglected their duties in preventing invasions. Provincials became victims of frequent raids by foreign tribes, such as the Carpians, Goths, Vandals, and Alamanni, along the Rhine and Danube Rivers in the western part of the empire, as well as attacks from Sassanids in the eastern part of the Empire. Additionally, in 251, the Plague of Cyprian (possibly smallpox) broke out, causing large-scale mortality which may have seriously affected the ability of the Empire to defend itself.

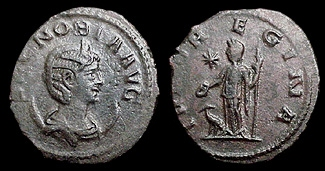
An antoninianus coin depicting Zenobia, showing her diadem and draped bust on a crescent with the reverse showing a standing figure of Iuno Regina

By 258, the Roman Empire broke up into three competing states. The Roman provinces of Gaul, Britain and Hispania broke off to form the Gallic Empire and, two years later in 260, the eastern provinces of Syria, Palestine and Aegyptus became independent as the Palmyrene Empire, leaving the remaining Italian-centred Roman Empire-proper in the middle.

An invasion by a vast host of Goths was beaten back at the Battle of Naissus in 269. This victory was significant as the turning point of the crisis, when a series of tough, energetic soldier-emperors took power. Victories by the emperor Claudius Gothicus over the next two years drove back the Alamanni and recovered Hispania from the Gallic Empire. When Claudius died in 270 of the plague, Aurelian, who had commanded the cavalry at Naissus, succeeded him as the emperor and continued the restoration of the Empire.

Aurelian reigned (270–275) through the worst of the crisis, defeating the Vandals, the Visigoths, the Palmyrenes, the Persians, and then the remainder of the Gallic Empire. By late 274, the Roman Empire was reunited into a single entity, and the frontier troops were back in place. More than a century would pass before Rome again lost military ascendancy over its external enemies. However, dozens of formerly thriving cities, especially in the western empire, had been ruined, their populations dispersed and, with the breakdown of the economic system, could not be rebuilt. Major cities and towns, even Rome itself, had not needed fortifications for many centuries; many then surrounded themselves with thick walls.

Finally, although Aurelian had played a significant role in restoring the Empire's borders from external threat, more fundamental problems remained. In particular, the right of succession had never been clearly defined in the Roman Empire, leading to continuous civil wars as competing factions in the military, Senate and other parties put forward their favoured candidate for emperor. Another issue was the sheer size of the Empire, which made it difficult for a single autocratic ruler to effectively manage multiple threats at the same time. These continuing problems would be radically addressed by Diocletian, allowing the Empire to continue to survive in the West for over a century and in the East for over a millennium.

== Later Roman Empire ==
As a matter of historical convention, the late Roman Empire emerged from the Principate (the early Roman Empire), with the accession of Diocletian in 284, following the Third Century Crisis of AD 235–284. The end of the late Empire is usually marked in the west with the collapse of the western empire in AD 476, while in the east its end is disputed, as either occurring at the close of the reign of Justinian I (AD 565) or of Heraclius (AD 641). The subsequent period of centuries of the Roman Empire's history is conventionally labelled the "Byzantine Empire", with the reign of Heraclius beginning the Middle Byzantine period, which lasted until the Fourth Crusade.

=== Diocletian and the Tetrarchy (284–301) ===
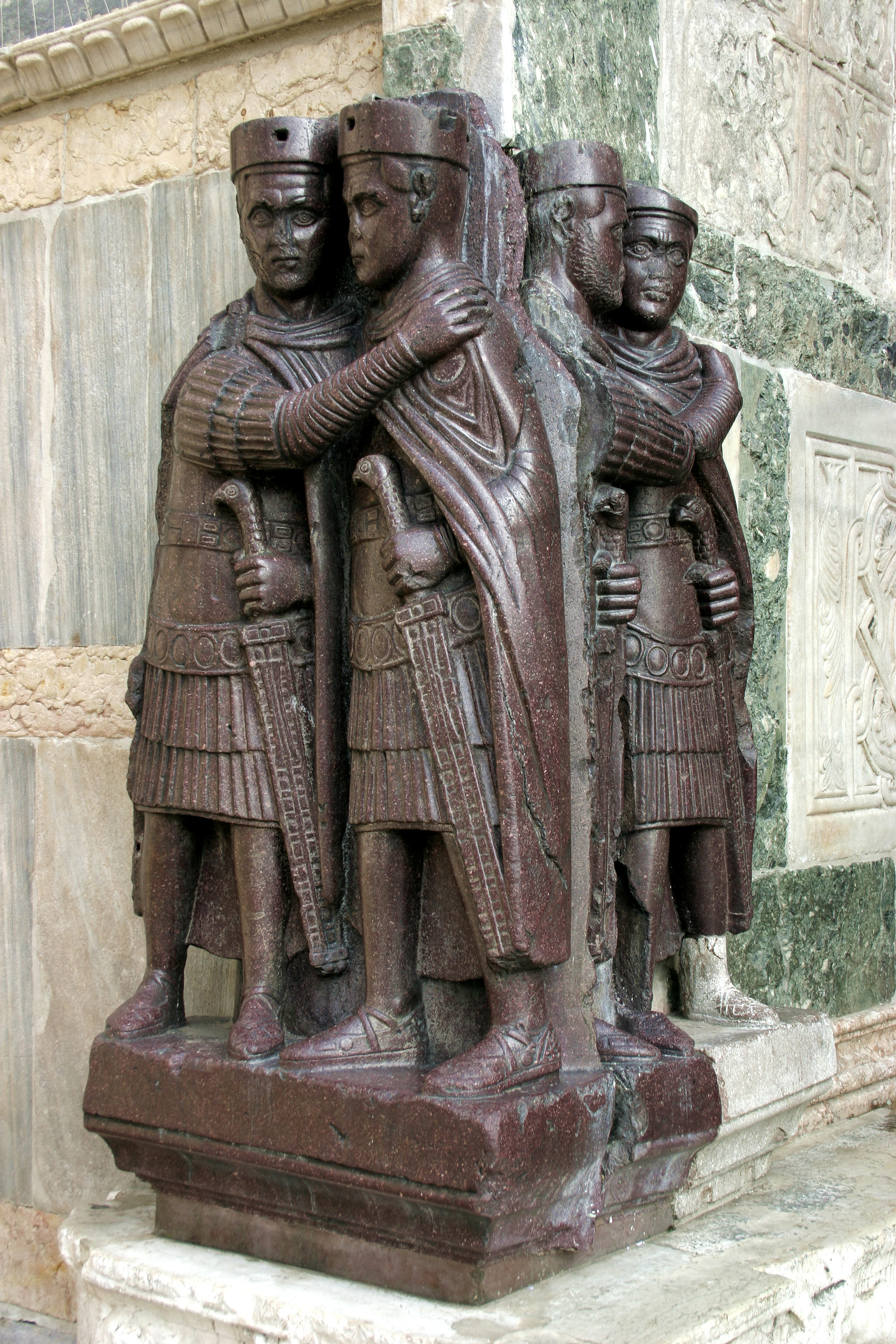
The Tetrarchs, a porphyry sculpture sacked from a Byzantine palace in 1204, Treasury of St Mark's, Venice

The transition to divided western and eastern halves of the empire was gradual. In July 285, Diocletian defeated rival emperor Carinus and briefly became sole emperor of the Roman Empire. Diocletian's reign stabilised the empire and marked the end of the Crisis of the Third Century. Diocletian appointed a co-emperor in 286 and delegated further with two junior-emperors.

Diocletian secured the empire's borders and purged it of all threats to his power. He defeated the Sarmatians and Carpi during several campaigns between 285 and 299, the Alamanni in 288, and usurpers in Egypt between 297 and 298. Galerius, aided by Diocletian, campaigned successfully against Sassanid Persia, the empire's traditional enemy. In 299, he sacked their capital, Ctesiphon. Diocletian led the subsequent negotiations and achieved a lasting and favourable peace. Diocletian separated and enlarged the empire's civil and military services and reorganised the empire's provincial divisions, establishing the largest and most bureaucratic government in the history of the empire. He established new administrative centres in Nicomedia, Mediolanum, Antioch, and Trier, closer to the empire's frontiers than the traditional capital at Rome had been. Building on third-century trends towards absolutism, he styled himself an autocrat, elevating himself above the empire's masses with imposing forms of court ceremonies and architecture. Bureaucratic and military growth, constant campaigning, and construction projects increased the state's expenditures and necessitated a comprehensive tax reform. From at least 297 on, imperial taxation was standardised, made more equitable, and levied at generally higher rates.

Diocletian saw that the vast Roman Empire was ungovernable by a single emperor in the face of internal pressures and military threats on two fronts. He therefore split the Empire in half along a northwest axis just east of Italy, and created two equal emperors to rule under the title of augustus. Diocletian himself was the augustus of the eastern half, and he made his long-time friend Maximian augustus of the western half. In doing so, he effectively created what would become the western empire and the eastern empire.

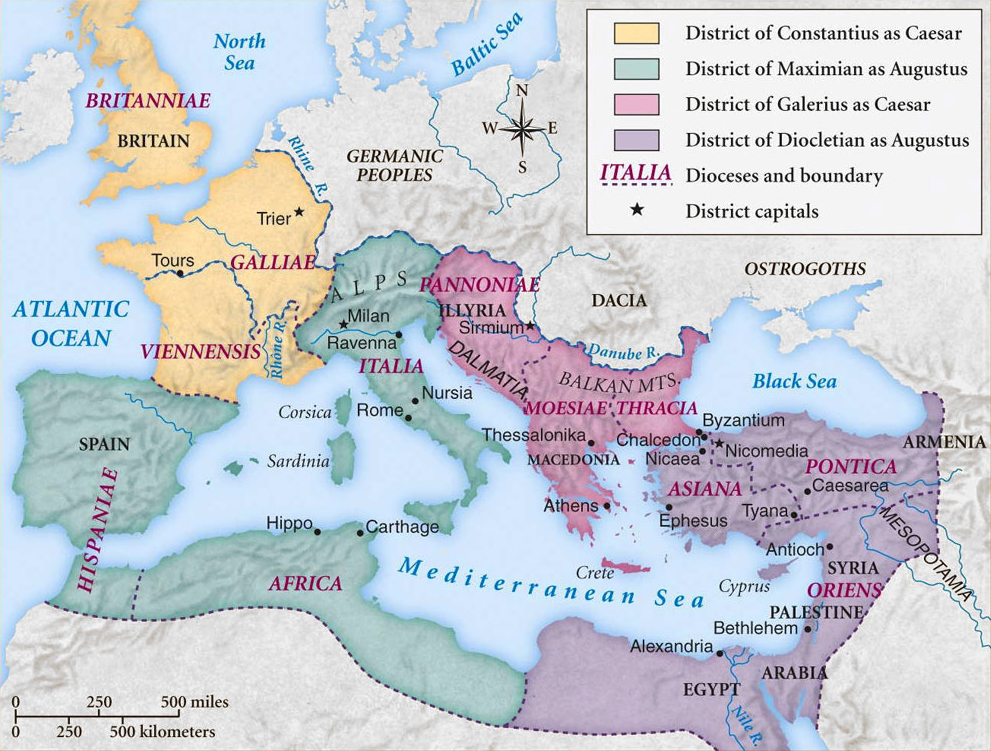
Map of the Roman Empire under the Tetrarchy, showing the dioceses and the four tetrarchs' zones of influence

On 1 March 293, authority was further divided. Each augustus took a junior emperor called a caesar to aid him in administrative matters, and to provide a line of succession. Galerius became caesar for Diocletian and Constantius Chlorus caesar for Maximian. This constituted what is called the Tetrarchy by modern scholars, as each emperor would rule over a quarter-division of the empire. After the empire had been plagued by bloody disputes about the supreme authority, this finally formalised a peaceful succession of the emperor: in each half a caesar would rise up to replace the augustus and select a new caesar. On 1 May 305, Diocletian and Maximian abdicated in favour of their caesares. Galerius named the two new caesares: his nephew Maximinus Daia for himself, and Valerius Severus for Constantius. The arrangement worked well under Diocletian and Maximian and shortly thereafter. The internal tensions within the Roman government were less acute than they had been. In The History of the Decline and Fall of the Roman Empire, Edward Gibbon notes that this arrangement worked well because of the affinity the four rulers had for each other. Gibbon says that this arrangement has been compared to a "chorus of music". With the retirement of Diocletian and Maximian, this harmony disappeared.

After an initial period of tolerance, Diocletian, who was a fervent pagan and was worried about the ever-increasing numbers of Christians in the Empire, persecuted them with zeal unknown since the time of Nero; this was to be one of the greatest persecutions the Christians endured in history. Not all of Diocletian's plans were successful: the Edict on Maximum Prices (301), his attempt to curb inflation via price controls, was counterproductive and quickly ignored. Although effective while he ruled, Diocletian's tetrarchic system collapsed after his abdication under the competing dynastic claims of Maxentius and Constantine, sons of Maximian and Constantius respectively. The Diocletianic Persecution (303–11), the empire's last, largest, and bloodiest official persecution of Christianity, did not destroy the empire's Christian community; indeed, after 324 Christianity became the empire's preferred religion under its first Christian emperor, Constantine.

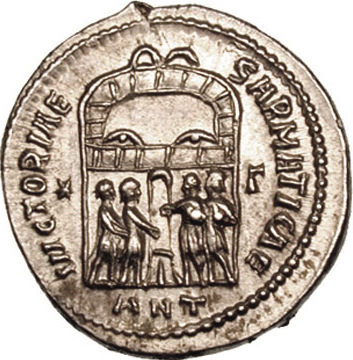
On the reverse of this argenteus struck in Antioch under Constantius Chlorus, the tetrarchs are sacrificing to celebrate a victory against the Sarmatians.

In spite of his failures, Diocletian's reforms fundamentally changed the structure of Roman imperial government and helped stabilise the empire economically and militarily, enabling the empire to remain essentially intact for another hundred years despite being near the brink of collapse in Diocletian's youth. Weakened by illness, Diocletian left the imperial office on 1 May 305, and became the first Roman emperor to voluntarily abdicate the position (John VI retired to a monastery in the 14th century). He lived out his retirement in his palace on the Dalmatian coast, tending to his vegetable gardens. His palace eventually became the core of the modern-day city of Split.

The peaceful Tetrarchy would effectively collapse with the death of Constantius Chlorus on 25 July 306. Constantius's troops in Eboracum immediately proclaimed his son Constantine the Great as augustus. In August 306, Galerius promoted Severus to the position of augustus. A revolt in Rome supported another claimant to the same title: Maxentius, son of Maximian, who was proclaimed augustus on 28 October 306. His election was supported by the Praetorian Guard and the Roman Senate. This left the Empire with five rulers: four augusti (Galerius, Constantine, Severus and Maxentius) and one caesar (Maximinus).

The year 307 saw the return of Maximian to the rank of augustus alongside his son Maxentius, creating a total of six rulers of the Empire. Galerius and Severus campaigned against them in Italy. Severus was killed under command of Maxentius on 16 September 307. The two augusti of Italy also managed to ally themselves with Constantine by having Constantine marry Fausta, the daughter of Maximian and sister of Maxentius. At the end of 307, the Empire had four augusti (Maximian, Galerius, Constantine and Maxentius) and a sole caesar.

In 311, Galerius's Edict of Serdica officially put an end to the persecution of Christians, though the persecution continued in the territory of Maximinius Daia until his death in 313. Constantine and his co-augustus Licinius legalised Christianity definitively in 313 in the so-called Edict of Milan. In 317, Constantine and Licinius elevated three of the grandchildren of Constantius to caesar: Constantine's eldest sons Crispus and Constantine II, and his nephew, Licinius's son Licinius II. Constantine defeated his brother-in-law in 324 and executed both him and his son. This unified the empire under his control as sole augustus, with only his young sons as co-emperors; he raised his son Constantius II to caesar in 324.

=== Constantinian dynasty (324–363) ===
==== Constantine and his sons ====
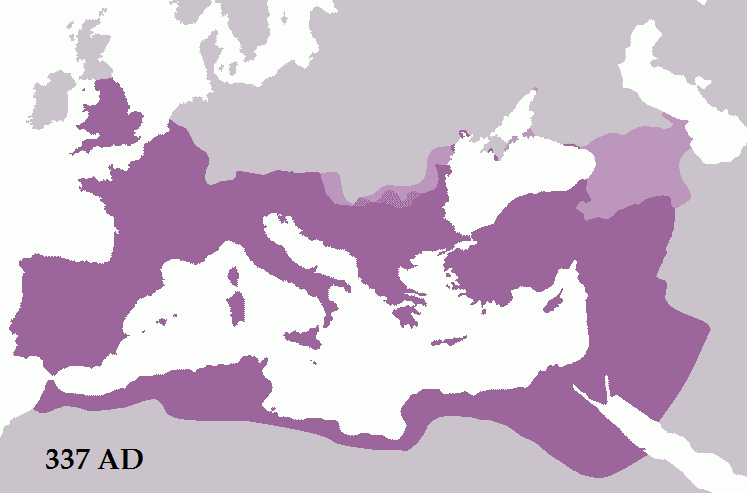
The empire under Constantine (337)

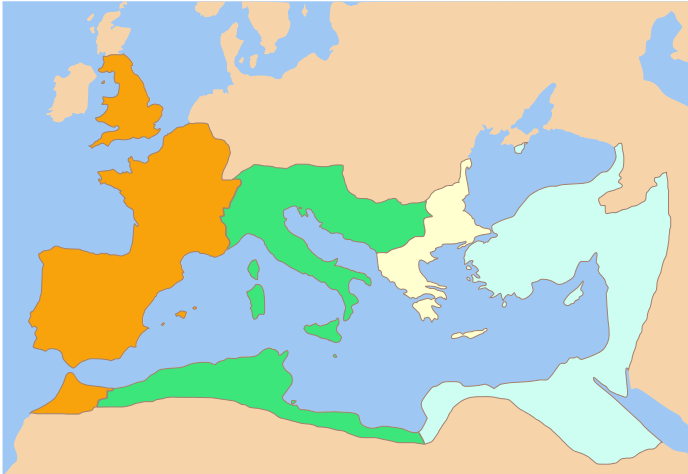
Division of the Roman Empire among the caesares appointed by Constantine I: from west to east, the territories of Constantine II, Constans, Dalmatius and Constantius II

Having executed his eldest son and caesar Crispus in 326, Constantine also elevated his son Constans to caesar in 333, as well as appointing his relatives Dalmatius and Hannibalianus to caesar and King of Kings respectively. Constantine would rule until his death on 22 May 337. On their father's death, an interregnum followed during which Constantine II, Constantius II, and Constans eliminated most of the Constantinian dynasty in a struggle for power that ended with the elevation of the three brothers as co-augusti in September 337. The empire was parted again among his three surviving sons.

Constantine II was killed in conflict with his youngest brother in 340. Constans was himself killed in conflict with the rebel augustus Magnentius on 18 January 350. Magnentius was at first opposed in the city of Rome by self-proclaimed augustus Nepotianus, a paternal first cousin of Constans. Nepotianus was killed alongside his mother Eutropia. His other first cousin Constantia convinced Vetranio to proclaim himself caesar in opposition to Magnentius. Vetranio served a brief term from 1 March to 25 December 350. He was then forced to abdicate by the legitimate augustus Constantius. The usurper Magnentius would continue to rule the western Roman Empire until 353 while in conflict with Constantius. His eventual defeat and suicide left Constantius as sole emperor until the nomination of his cousin Constantius Gallus as his caesar and co-emperor.

Constantius's rule would, however, be opposed again in 360. After his execution of Constantius Gallus, the augustus Constantius had named his paternal half-cousin and brother-in-law Julian as his caesar in 355, sending him to rule from Trier. During the following five years, Julian had a series of victories against invading Germanic tribes, including the Alamanni. This allowed him to secure the Rhine frontier. His victorious Gallic troops thus ceased campaigning. Constantius sent orders for the troops to be transferred to the east as reinforcements for his own currently unsuccessful campaign against Shapur II of Persia. This order led the Gallic troops to an insurrection. They acclaimed, invested, and crowned their commanding officer Julian as augustus after the decisive Battle of Strasbourg, a distinction he had previously been offered but declined. Both augusti readied their troops for another Roman civil war, but the timely demise of Constantius on 3 November 361 and his deathbed recognition of Julian as co-augustus prevented the Roman civil war of 350–353 from reaching Constantinople.

==== Julian (361–363) ====
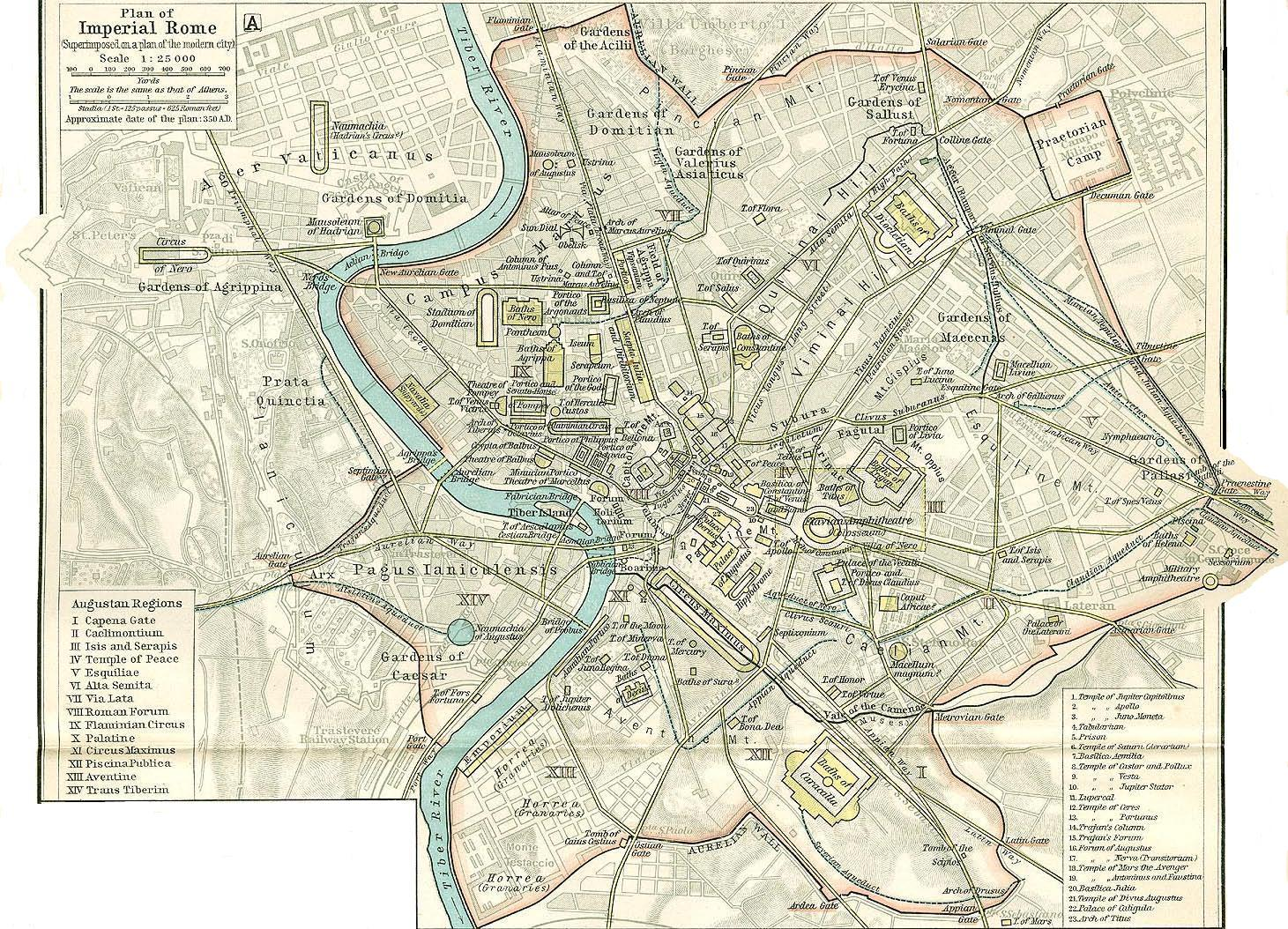
Map of Rome in 350

Julian would serve as the sole emperor for two years. He had been raised by the Gothic slave Mardonius, a great admirer of ancient Greek philosophy and literature. Julian had received his baptism as a Christian years before, but no longer considered himself one. His reign would see the ending of restrictions and violence against paganism introduced by his uncle and father-in-law Constantine I and his cousins and brothers-in-law Constantine II, Constans and Constantius II. He instead placed similar restrictions on Christianity, and some unofficial violence against Christians occurred. His edict of toleration in 362 ordered the reopening of pagan temples and the reinstitution of alienated temple properties, and, more problematically for the Christian Church, the recalling of previously exiled Christian bishops. Returning orthodox and Arian bishops resumed their conflicts, thus further weakening the Church as a whole.

Julian himself was not a traditional pagan. His personal beliefs were largely influenced by Neoplatonism and Theurgy; he reputedly believed he was the reincarnation of Alexander the Great. He produced works of philosophy arguing his beliefs. His brief renaissance of paganism would, however, end with his death. Julian eventually resumed the war against Shapur II of Persia. He received a mortal wound in battle and died on 26 June 363.

According to Gibbon in The Decline and Fall of the Roman Empire, upon being mortally wounded by a dart, he was carried back to his camp. He gave a farewell speech, in which he refused to name a successor. He then proceeded to debate the philosophical nature of the soul with his generals. He then requested water and, shortly after drinking it, died. He was considered a hero by pagan sources of his time and a villain by Christian ones. Gibbon wrote quite favourably about Julian. Contemporary historians have treated him as a controversial figure.

==== Jovian (364) ====
Julian died childless and with no designated successor. The officers of his army elected the rather obscure officer Jovian emperor. He is remembered for signing an unfavourable peace treaty with the Sasanian Empire, ceding territories won from the Persians, dating back to Trajan. He restored the privileges of Christianity. He is considered a Christian himself, though little is known of his beliefs. Jovian himself died on 17 February 364.

=== Valentinianic dynasty (364–392) ===
==== Valentinian and Valens ====
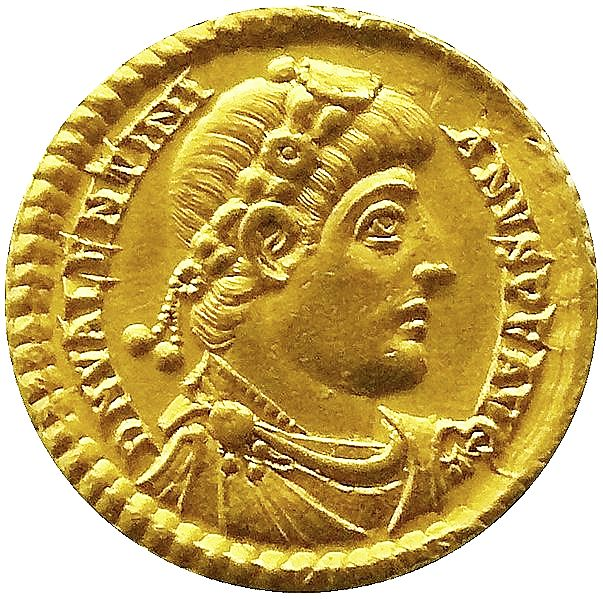
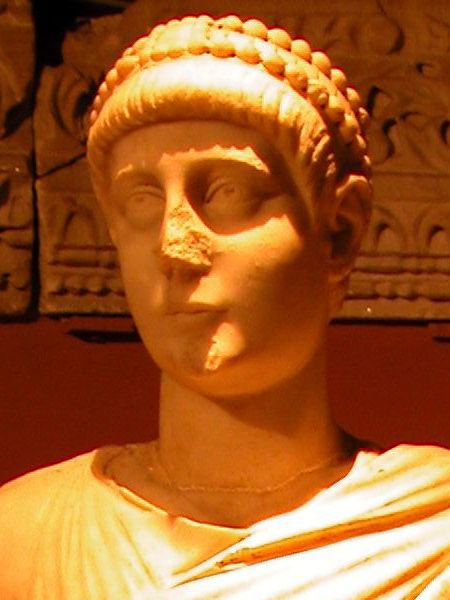
A golden solidus depicting Valentinian I (r. 364–375) and (righthand image) a marble statue of his son and later ruler Valentinian II (r. 375–392)

The role of choosing a new augustus fell again to army officers. On 28 February 364, Pannonian officer Valentinian I was elected augustus in Nicaea, Bithynia. The army had been left leaderless twice in less than a year, and the officers demanded Valentinian choose a co-ruler. On 28 March, Valentinian chose his own younger brother Valens and the two new augusti parted the empire in the pattern established by Diocletian: Valentinian would administer the western provinces, while Valens took control over the eastern empire.

The election of Valens was soon disputed. Procopius, a Cilician maternal cousin of Julian, had been considered a likely heir to his cousin but was never designated as such. He had been in hiding since the election of Jovian. In 365, while Valentinian was at Paris and then at Rheims to direct the operations of his generals against the Alamanni, Procopius managed to bribe two legions assigned to Constantinople and take control of Constantinople. He was acclaimed augustus on 28 September and soon extended his control to both Thrace and Bithynia. War between the rival emperors continued until Procopius was defeated. Valens had him executed on 27 May 366.

On 4 August 367, the eight-year-old Gratian was proclaimed as a third augustus by his father Valentinian, who had fallen ill, a nominal co-ruler and means to secure succession.

In April 375, Valentinian I led his army in a campaign against the Quadi, a Germanic tribe which had invaded his native region of Pannonia. According to Ammianus Marcellinus, during an audience with an embassy from the Quadi at Brigetio on the Danube, Valentinian suffered a burst blood vessel in his brain while angrily yelling at the people gathered, resulting in his death on 17 November 375. Gratian was then a 16-year-old and arguably ready to act as emperor, but the troops in Pannonia proclaimed his infant half-brother emperor under the title Valentinian II. Valens and Gratian acquiesced in their choice. While the senior augustus administered the eastern empire, Gratian governed the praetorian prefecture of Gaul. The praetorian prefecture of Italy, Illyricum, and Africa were officially administrated by infant brother and Gratian's stepmother Justina. However the division was merely nominal, actual authority in the west still rested with Gratian, and with Valens as the senior emperor.

===== Battle of Adrianople (378) =====
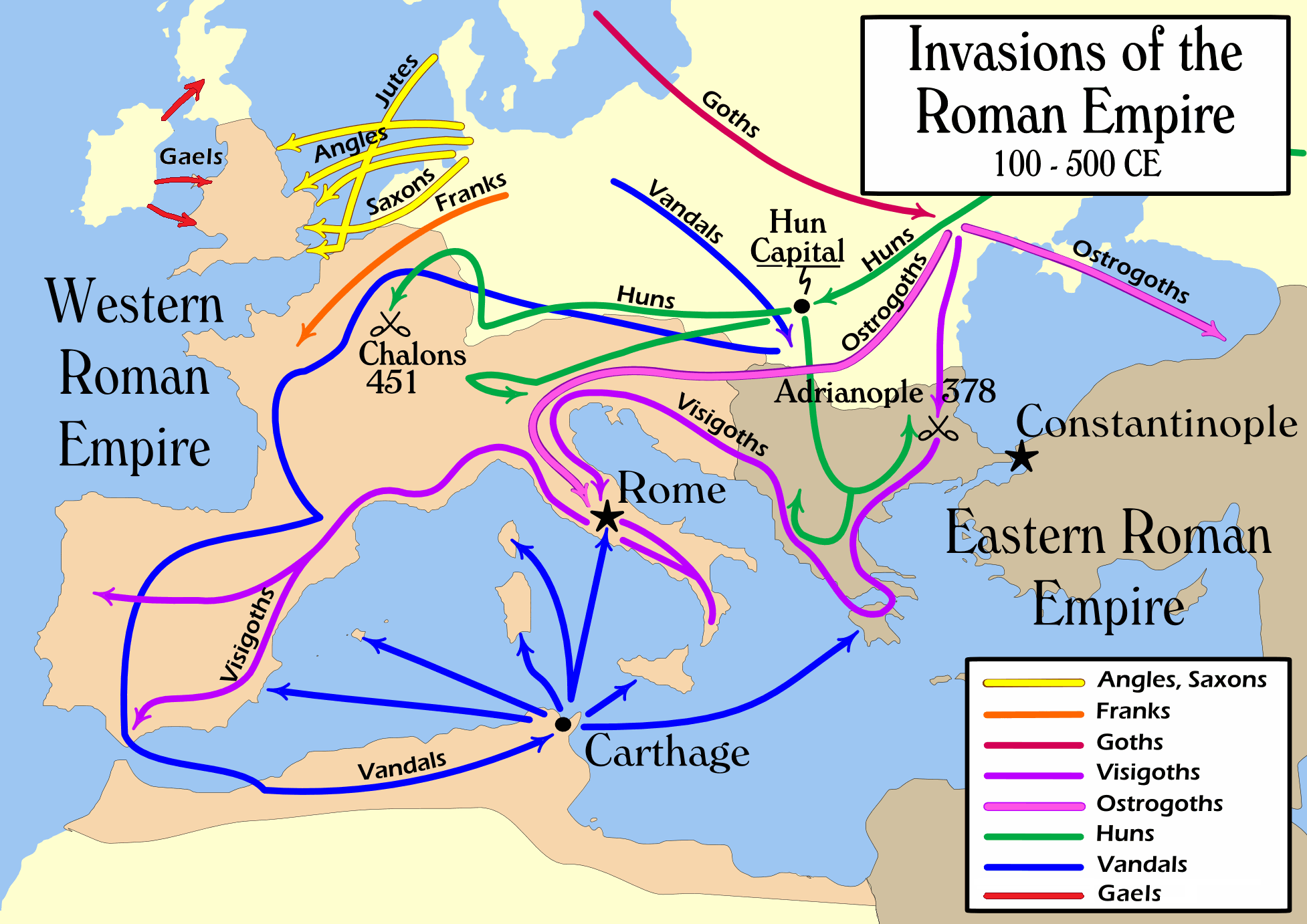
Barbarian invasions of the Roman Empire, showing the Battle of Adrianople

Meanwhile, the Eastern Roman Empire faced its own problems with Germanic tribes. The Thervingi, an East Germanic tribe, fled their former lands following an invasion by the Huns. Their leaders Alavivus and Fritigern led them to seek refuge in the Eastern Roman Empire. Valens allowed them to settle as foederati on the southern bank of the Danube in 376. However, the newcomers faced problems from allegedly corrupted provincial commanders and a series of hardships. Their dissatisfaction led them to revolt against their Roman hosts.

Conflicts continued for the following two years. Valens led a campaign against them in 378. Gratian provided his uncle with reinforcements from the western Roman army. However, this campaign proved disastrous for the Romans. The two armies approached each other near Adrianople. Valens was apparently overconfident of the numerical superiority of his own forces over the Goths. Some of his officers advised caution and to await the arrival of Gratian, others urged an immediate attack and eventually prevailed over Valens, who, eager to have all of the glory for himself, rushed into battle. On 9 August 378, the Battle of Adrianople resulted in the crushing defeat of the Romans and the death of Valens. Contemporary historian Ammianus Marcellinus estimated that two-thirds of the Roman army were lost in the battle.

The battle had far-reaching consequences. Veteran soldiers and valuable administrators were among the heavy casualties. There were few available replacements at the time, leaving the Empire with the problem of finding suitable leadership. The Roman army also started to face recruiting problems. In the following century much of the Roman army would consist of Germanic mercenaries.

==== Gratian and Valentinian II ====
The death of Valens left Gratian and Valentinian II as the sole augusti. Gratian was now effectively responsible for the whole empire. He sought a replacement augustus for the Eastern Roman Empire. His choice was Theodosius I, son of formerly distinguished magister equitum Count Theodosius. The elder Theodosius had been executed in early 375 for unclear reasons. The younger Theodosius was named Gratian and Valentinian's junior co-augustus on 19 January 379, at Sirmium.

Gratian governed the western Roman Empire with energy and success for some years, but he gradually sank into indolence. He is considered to have become a figurehead while Frankish general Merobaudes and bishop Ambrose of Milan jointly acted as the power behind the throne. Gratian lost favour with factions of the Roman Senate by prohibiting traditional paganism at Rome and relinquishing his title of Pontifex maximus. The senior augustus also became unpopular with his own Roman troops because of his close association with so-called barbarians. He reportedly recruited Alans to his personal service and adopted the guise of a Scythian warrior for public appearances.

Meanwhile, Gratian, Valentinian II and Theodosius were joined by a fourth augustus. Theodosius elevated his oldest son Arcadius to augustus in January 383, in an obvious attempt to secure succession. The boy was still only five or six years old and held no actual authority. Nevertheless, he was recognised as a co-emperor by all three augusti.

===== Rebellion of Magnus Maximus (383–388) =====
The increasing unpopularity of Gratian would cause the four augusti problems later that same year. Magnus Maximus, a general from Hispania, stationed in Roman Britain, was proclaimed augustus by his troops in 383 and, rebelling against Gratian, he invaded Gaul. Gratian fled from Lutetia (Paris) to Lugdunum (Lyon), where he was assassinated on 25 August 383, at the age of 25.

Maximus was a firm believer of the Nicene Creed and introduced state persecution on charges of heresy, which brought him into conflict with Pope Siricius, who argued that the augustus had no authority over church matters. But he was an emperor with popular support, as is attested in Romano-British tradition, where he gained a place in the Mabinogion, compiled about a thousand years after his death.

Following Gratian's death, Maximus had to deal with Valentinian II, at the time only twelve years old, as the senior augustus. During the first few years, the Alps would serve as the borders between the respective territories of the two rival western Roman emperors. Maximus controlled the praetorian prefecture of Gaul. He assumed the government at Augusta Treverorum (Trier), the prefecture's capital.

Maximus soon entered negotiations with Valentinian II and Theodosius, attempting to gain their official recognition. By 384 negotiations were unfruitful and Maximus tried to press the matter by settling succession as only a legitimate emperor could do: proclaiming his own infant son Flavius Victor an augustus. The end of the year found the Empire having five augusti (Valentinian II, Theodosius I, Arcadius, Magnus Maximus and Flavius Victor) with relations between them yet to be determined. Theodosius was left a widower in 385, following the sudden death of Aelia Flaccilla, his augusta and the mother of Arcadius and Honorius.

In 386, Maximus and Victor finally received official recognition by Theodosius but not by Valentinian. In 387, Maximus apparently decided to rid himself of his Italian rival. He crossed the Alps into the valley of the Po and threatened Milan. Theodosius was remarried to the sister of Valentinian II, Galla, after their mother Justina fled with the young emperor to Theodosius's territory to escape Magnus Maximus's invasion of Italy. The marriage secured closer relations between the two augusti. Theodosius indeed campaigned west in 388 and was victorious against Maximus. Maximus himself was captured and executed in Aquileia on 28 July 388. The magister militum Arbogast was sent to Trier with orders to also kill Flavius Victor. Theodosius restored Valentinian to power and through his influence had him converted to orthodox catholic Christianity. Theodosius continued supporting Valentinian and protecting him from a variety of usurpations.

=== Valentinianic–Theodosian dynasty (379–457) ===
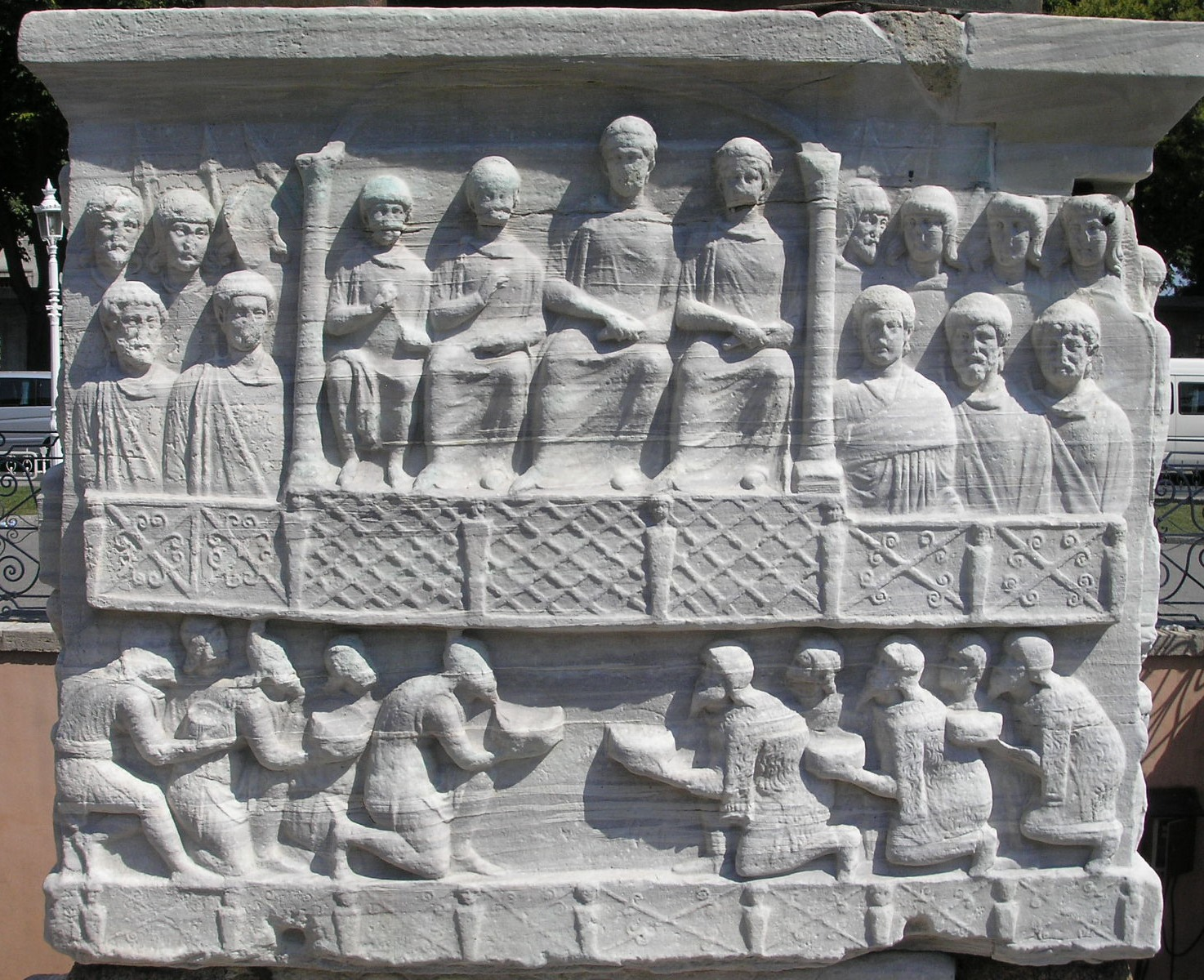
Detail of one of the carved reliefs on the Obelisk of Theodosius in Istanbul (Constantinople), showing Roman emperor Theodosius I surrounded by members of his court and receiving tributary gifts from foreign emissaries, late 4th century AD

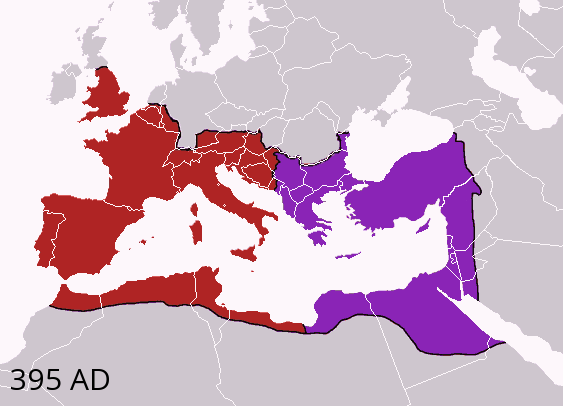
The division of the empire after the death of Theodosius I, c. 395, superimposed on modern borders. Western empire Eastern empire

==== Rebellion of Eugenius (392–394) ====
In 392 Valentinian II died mysteriously in Vienne. Arbogast, who may have killed him, arranged for the appointment of Eugenius as emperor. However, the eastern emperor Theodosius refused to recognise Eugenius as emperor and invaded the West, defeating and killing Arbogast and Eugenius at the Battle of the Frigidus. He thus reunited the entire Roman Empire under his rule, the last emperor who had practical power over the whole empire. On his death in February 395, the two halves of the Empire went to his two sons Arcadius and Honorius.

==== Arcadius and Honorius (395–423) ====
Arcadius became ruler in the East, with his capital in Constantinople, and Honorius became ruler in the West, with his capital in Milan and later Ravenna. The Roman state would continue to have two different emperors with different seats of power throughout the 5th century, though the eastern Romans considered themselves to be the only ones who were fully Roman. Latin was used in official writings as much as, if not more than, Greek and the two halves were nominally, culturally and historically, if not politically, the same state. Arcadius died in 408, having already elevated his infant son Theodosius II to augustus in 402. Theodosius II reigned for more than forty years.

Theodosius had two sons and a daughter, Pulcheria, from his first wife, Aelia Flacilla. His daughter and wife had died in 385. By his second wife, Galla, the daughter of Valentinian the Great, he had a daughter, Galla Placidia; his son Gratian did not survive infancy. Galla Placidia, having grown up at Constantinople, married first Athaulf, king of the Visigoths, and then the future Constantius III. Both her husbands died not long after the marriages, and Constantius III, who succeeded Honorius as augustus, reigned for less than a year. Galla Placidia and Constantius had two children: the future Valentinian III, who became augustus in the western empire, and Justa Grata Honoria.

On the death of Honorius, the official Joannes seized power in Italy and Thedosius II appointed Valentinian III his caesar and dispatched him to the western empire with an army, which deposed Joannes and whose commander elevated Valentinian to augustus on the first anniversary of his appointment as caesar. His mother the augusta Galla Placidia was regent during his youth. Valentinian III married Theodosius II's daughter Licinia Eudoxia and reigned for three decades until his murder by the rebel augustus Petronius Maximus and his caesar Palladius, who forced Valentinian's wife Licinia and daughter Placidia to marry them.

On the death of Theodosius II, the military officer Marcian was acclaimed Valentinian III's co-augustus and married the late emperor's elder sister, the augusta Pulcheria. Marcian was the last of the Theodosians to rule in the east, and only connected to them by marriage to the augusta. When Pulcheria died in 453 and Marcian died in 457, ending the Theodosian line, the court at Constantinople selected the general Leo I as his successor as augustus, beginning the reign of the Leonid dynasty.

==== Decline of the Western Roman Empire ====
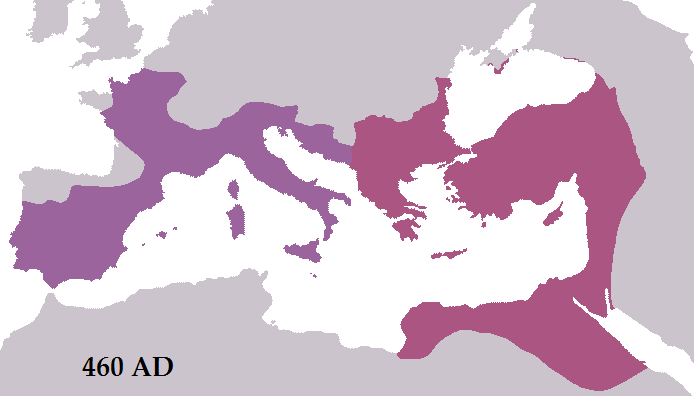
The western and eastern halves of the empire under Majorian and Leo (460)

The Roman Empire in 476

After 395, the emperors in the western empire were usually figureheads, while the actual rulers were military strongmen who took the title of magister militum, patrician or both—Stilicho from 395 to 408, Constantius from about 411 to 421, Aëtius from 433 to 454 and Ricimer from about 457 to 472.

The year 476 is generally accepted as the formal end of the Western Roman Empire. That year, Orestes, having stolen power from the emperor Julius Nepos the year before, refused the request of Germanic mercenaries in his service for lands in Italy. The dissatisfied mercenaries, including the Heruli, revolted. The revolt was led by the Germanic chieftain Odoacer. Odoacer and his men captured and executed Orestes; weeks later they captured Ravenna and deposed Orestes' usurper son, Romulus Augustus. This event has been traditionally considered the fall of the Roman Empire in the west. Odoacer quickly conquered the remaining provinces of Italy.

Odoacer returned the western imperial regalia to the eastern emperor, Zeno. Zeno soon received two deputations. One was from Odoacer requesting that his control of Italy be formally recognised by the empire, in which case he would in turn acknowledge Zeno's supremacy. The other deputation was from Julius Nepos, requesting support to regain the throne. Zeno granted Odoacer the title patrician. Zeno told Odoacer and the Roman Senate to take Nepos back, but Nepos never returned from Dalmatia, even though Odoacer issued coins in his name. Upon Nepos's death in 480, Zeno claimed Dalmatia for the East; J. B. Bury considers this the real end of the Western Roman Empire. Odoacer attacked Dalmatia, and the ensuing war ended with Theodoric the Great, King of the Ostrogoths, conquering Italy under Zeno's authority and forming the Ostrogothic Kingdom, with its capital at Ravenna.

== Map gallery ==
=== Empire ===
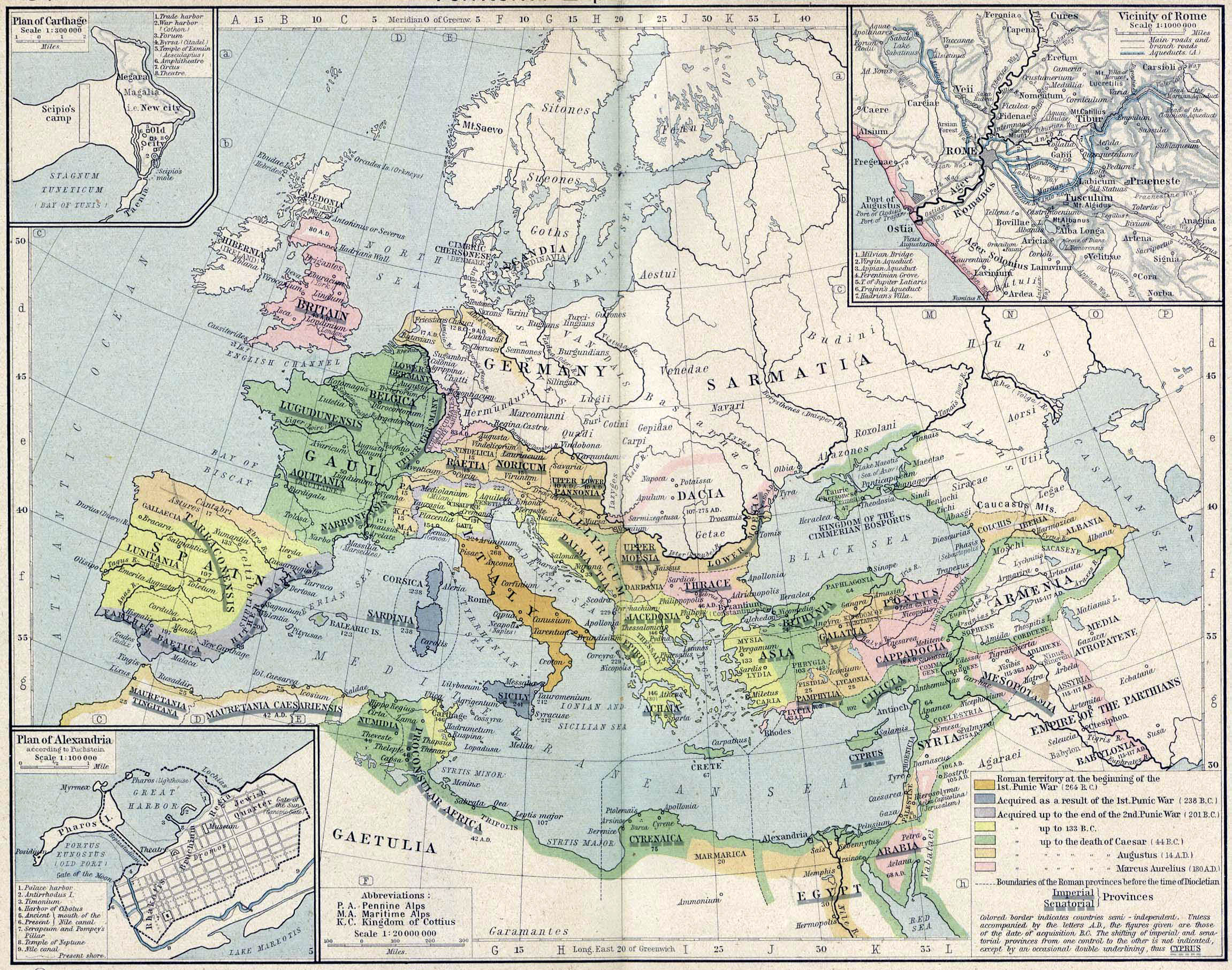

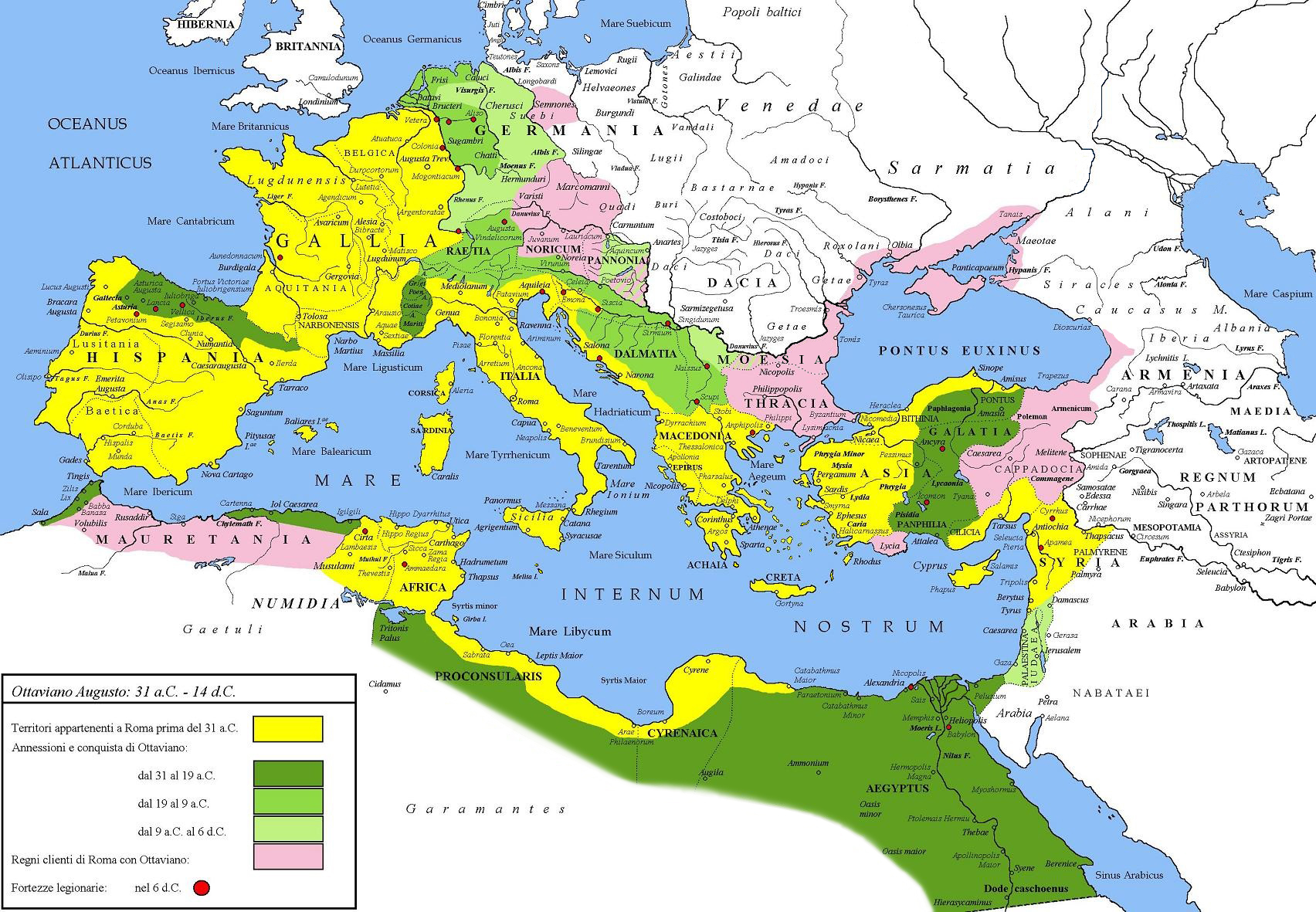

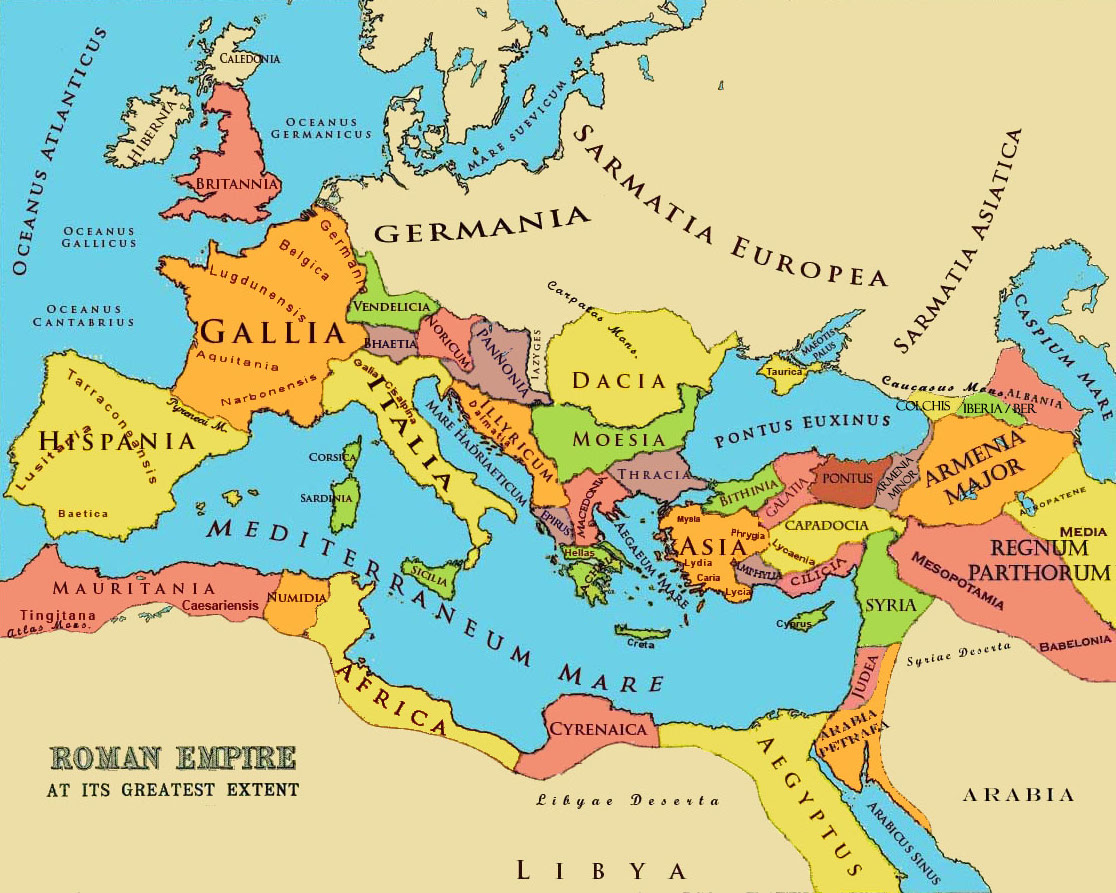

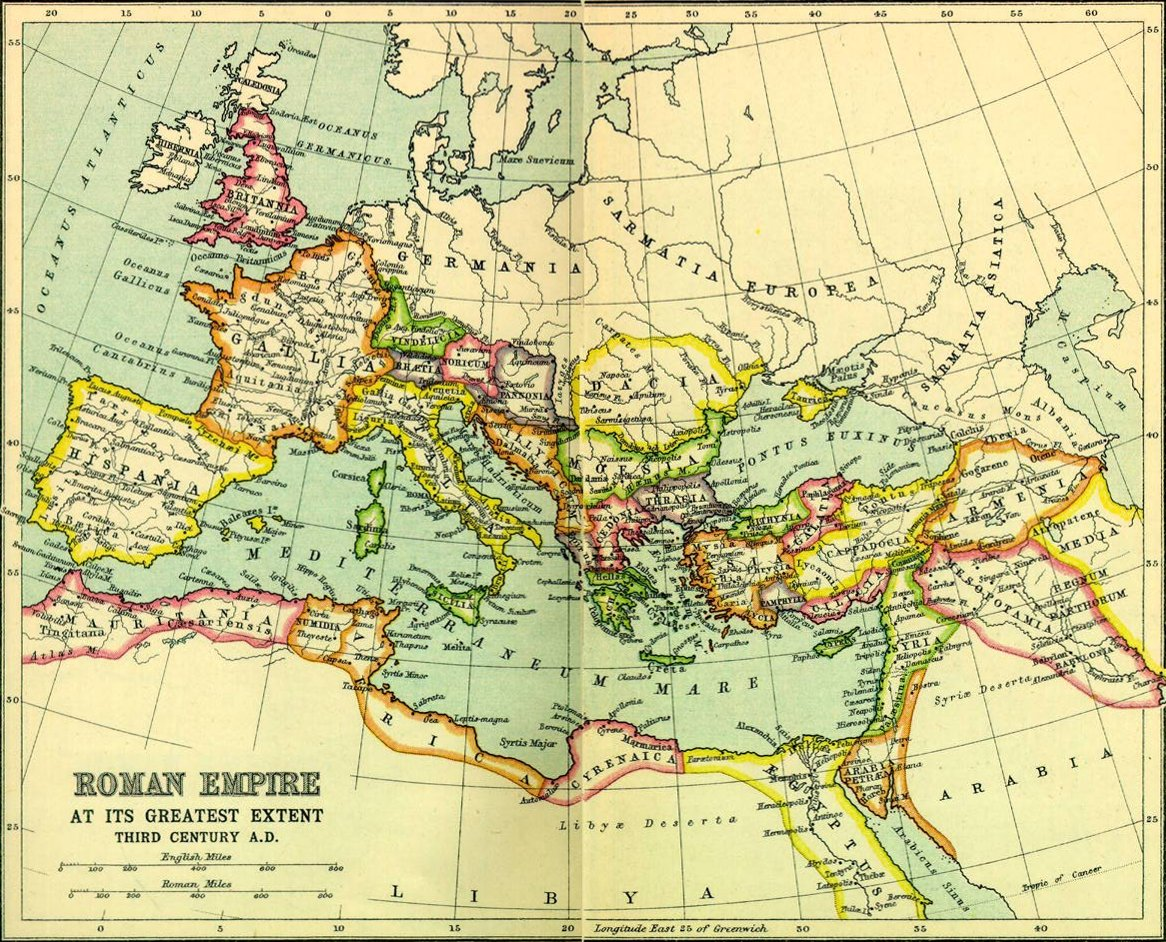

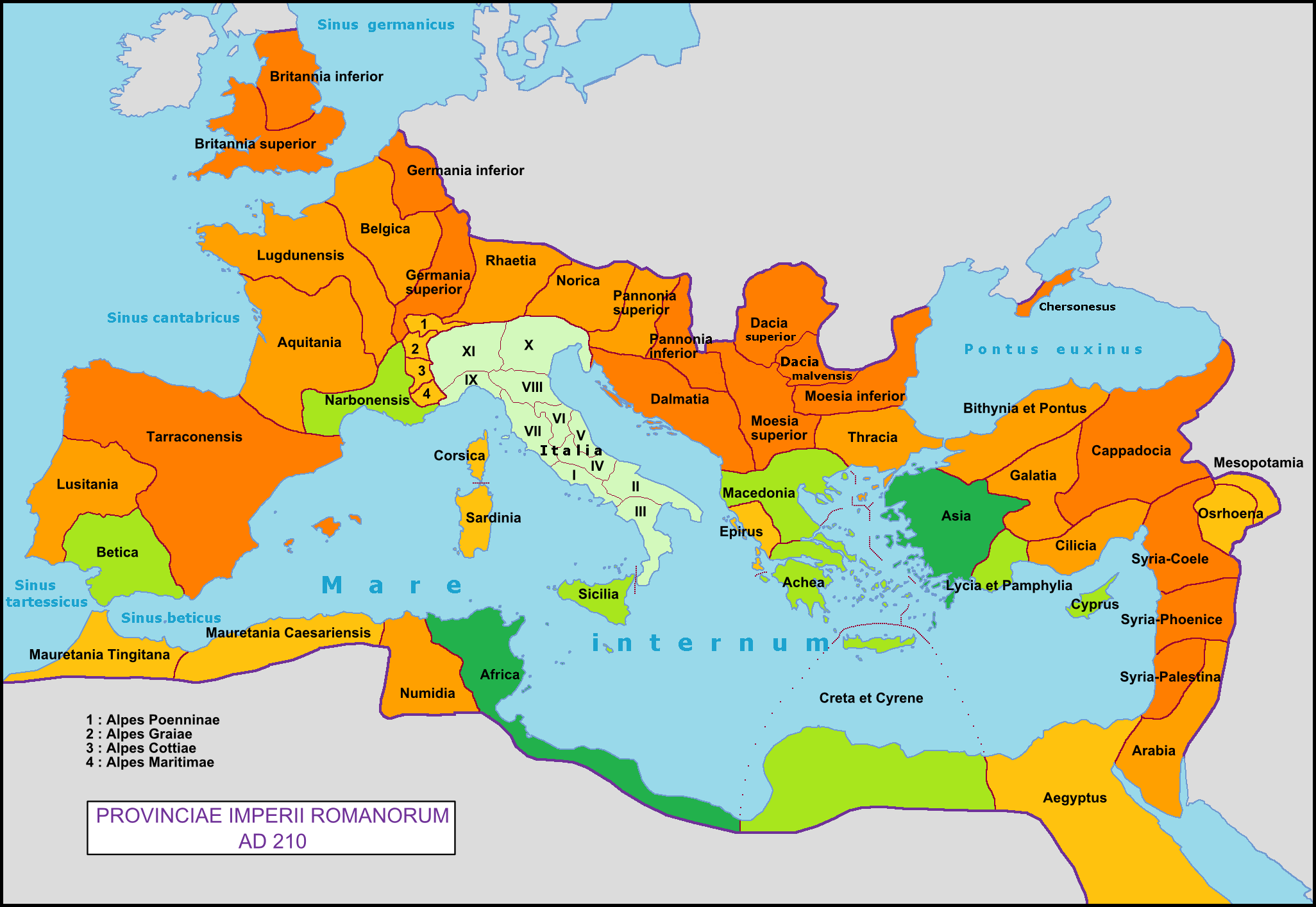

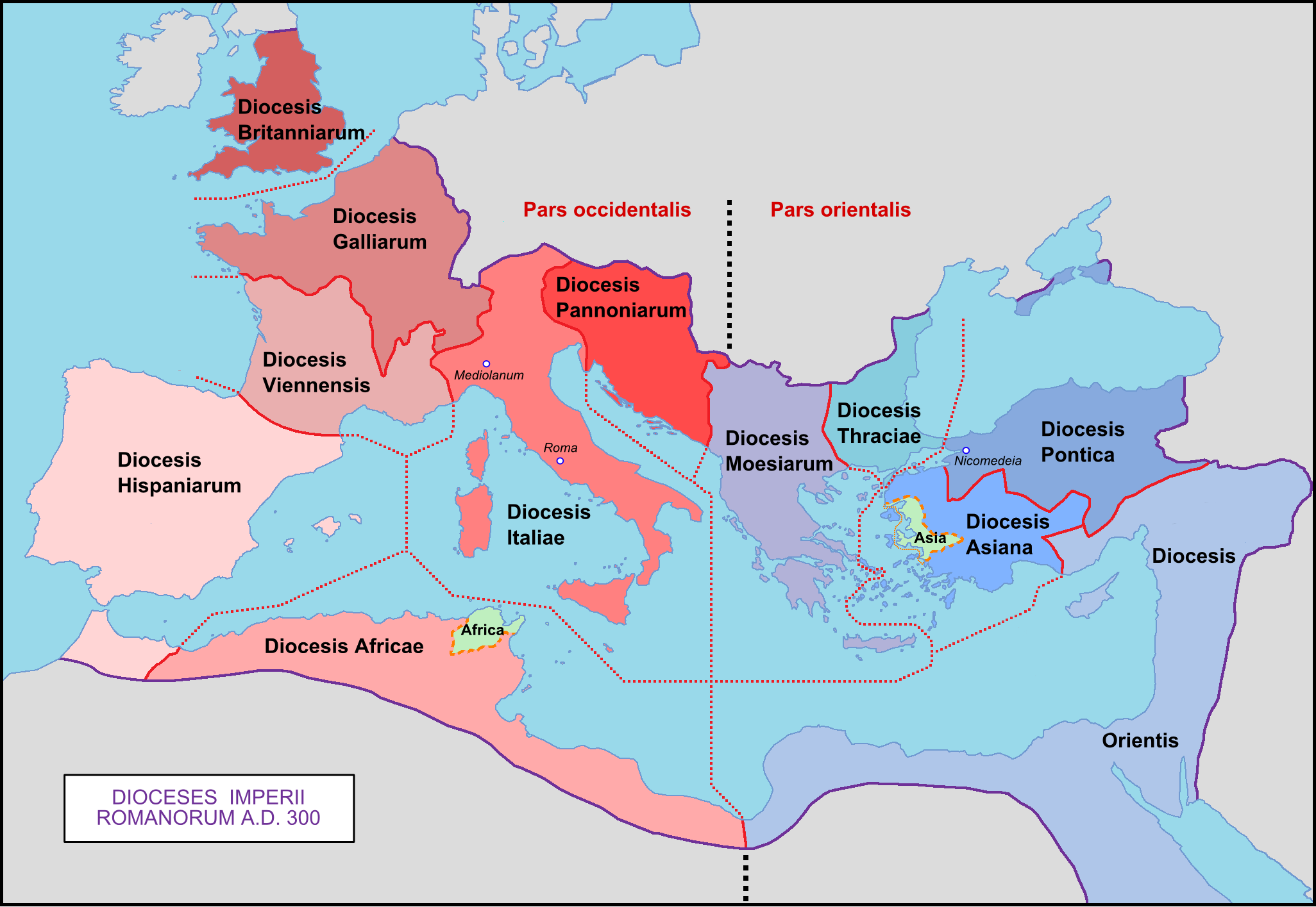

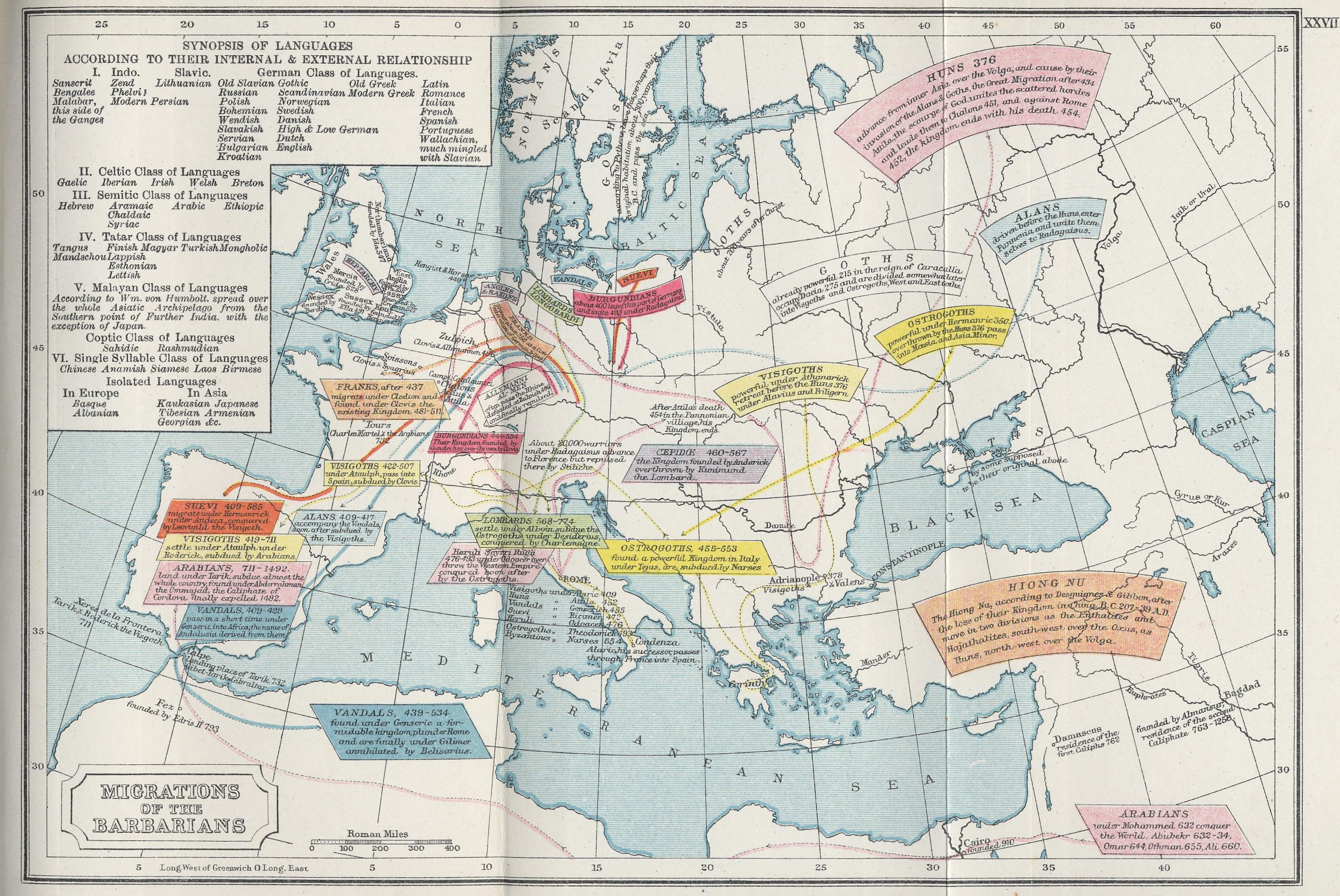

=== Orient ===
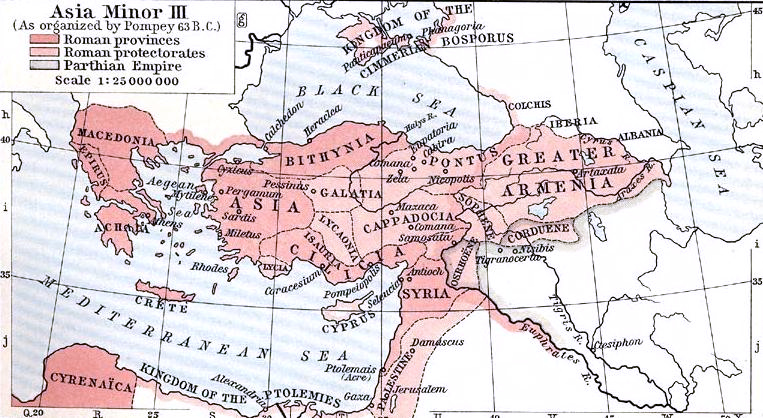

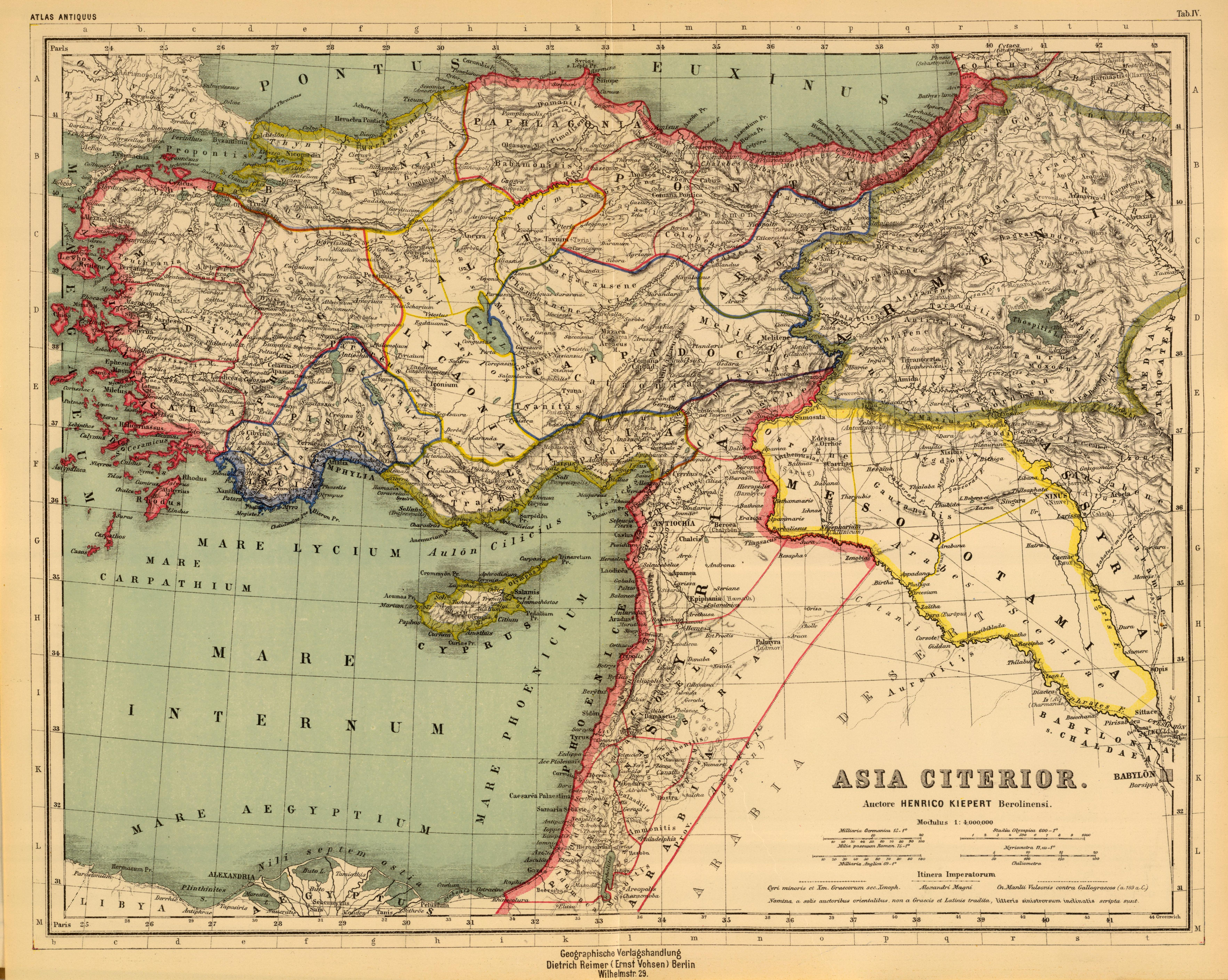

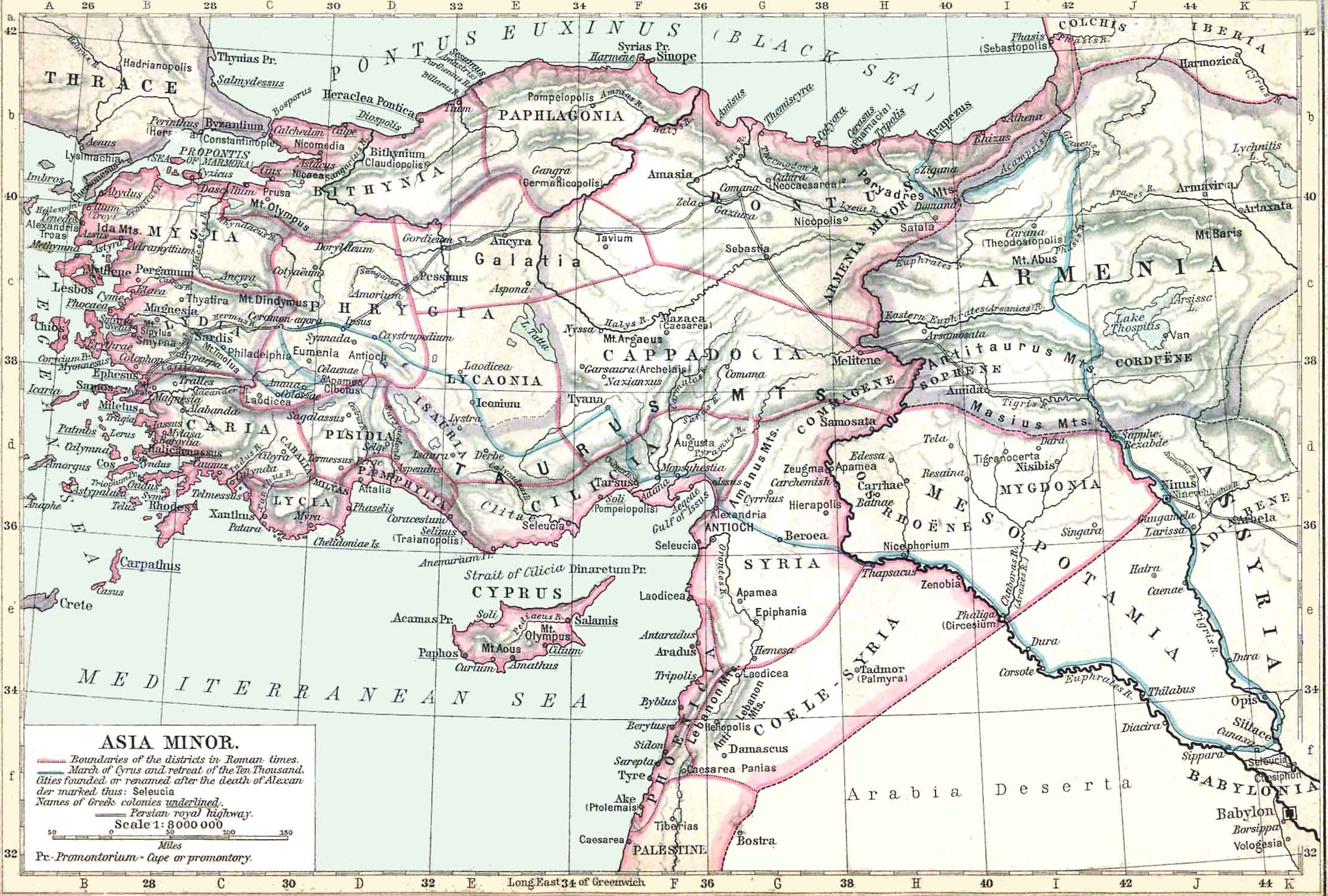

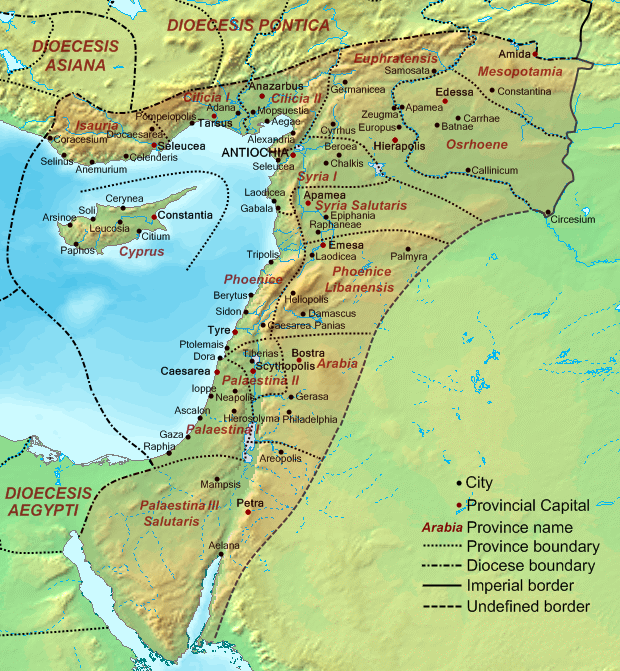

== See also ==
- History of Rome
- Timeline of Roman history
- Legacy of the Roman Empire
- Succession of the Roman Empire
- History of the Byzantine Empire

== Bibliography ==
- Abbott, Frank Frost (1901). A History and Description of Roman Political Institutions. Ginn. OCLC 1069567291.
- Bennett, Julian (1997). Trajan Optimus Princeps. A Life and Times. Indiana University Press. ISBN 0253332168.
- Cassius Dio (1914–1927) [c. 230 CE]. Dio's Roman History (in nine volumes). LCL # 344, 354, 356 (in Greek and English). Translated by Cary, Earnest; Foster, Herbert B. William Heinemann / Macmillan / G. P. Putnam's Sons / Harvard University Press. Online text at penelope.uchicago.edu.
- Disputed Authorship (1921–1932) [late 4th century CE]. Historia Augusta (in three volumes). LCL # 139, 140, 263 (in Latin and English). Translated by David Magie. Heinemann / Putnam. Online text at Internet Archive and penelope.uchicago.edu.
- Eck, Werner (2007). The Age of Augustus. Translated by Deborah Lucas Schneider (2nd ed.). Wiley-Blackwell. ISBN 9781405151498.
- Gibbon, Edward (1836) [1776–1789]. The History of the Decline and Fall of the Roman Empire. (4 volumes). Harper & Brothers. Online edition at Project Gutenberg.
- Herodian of Antioch (1961) [c. 244 CE]. History of the Roman Empire From the Death of Marcus Aurelius to the Accession of Gordian III. Translated by Edward C. Echols. University of California Press. Online text at livius.org.
- Starr, Chester G. (1991) [1965]. A History of the Ancient World (4th ed.). OUP. ISBN 0195066286.
- C. Suetonius Tranquillus (1914) [121 CE]. The Lives of the Caesars. (two volumes) LCL # 31, 38. Translated by John C. Rolfe. William Heinemann / Macmillan Co. Volume 1, Volume 2. Online text at penelope.uchicago.edu.
- Taagepera, Rein (1979). "Size and Duration of Empires: Growth-Decline Curves, 600 BC to AD 600". Social Science History. 3 (3/4). Duke University Press. pp. 115-138. JSTOR 1170959.
- Zosimus (1967) [c. 580]. Historia Nova. (Six Books). Translated by James J. Buchanan; Harold T. Davis. Trinity University Press.
