= Julius Laetus =

Roman commander

- Native name: Latin: Julius Laetus
- Died: 198
- Allegiance: Roman Empire
- Branch: Roman Imperial Army
- Rank: Comes?
- Conflicts: Year of the Five Emperors; Battle of Lugdunum; Septimius Severus' Parthian campaign; Siege of Nisibis; Siege of Hatra

Julius Laetus (fl. 193–198) was a Roman soldier. He fought for Emperor Septimius Severus, who eventually had him killed because he had become too popular amongst the troops. He possibly held the rank of comes.

== Bibliography ==
Julius Laetus' early life is unknown. He started military service in 193, when he commanded the Severan vanguard during the descent of Septimius Severus into Italy, to defeat his opponent Didius Julianus. Julianus had Severus acclaimed co-emperor and sent Tullius Crispinus to announce the event, but Laetus intercepted Crispinus and suggested to Severus that he should be put to death, which he did. The young general was then appointed Governor of Upper Pannonia.

He served in Mesopotamia in 195, as commander of one of the three expeditionary forces that, on two successive occasions, devastated the territories of the rebellious populations, these probably included the Osroeni and Adiabeni, fomented by the Parthian ruler Vologases V, and conquered their cities.

In the Battle of Lugdunum in 197, he commanded the Severan cavalry and inflicted the decisive blow on the troops of Clodius Albinus. In the same year he was sent to Mesopotamia on the occasion of the Parthian invasion. Here he rushed to the aid of the city of Nisibis, which was being besieged by the Parthians, and defended it until the arrival of Severus' troops.

The emperor entrusted him with the rank of comes, but without giving any command. In 198, on the occasion of the Siege of Hatra, he had him put to death because he feared his popularity among the troops. It is said that the soldiers were not willing to be led into battle by anyone other than Laetus. The story that he had initially retained his cavalry at Lugdunum because he intended to take the throne for himself was in all probability invented after his execution.

== Bibliography ==
Books

- Birley, Anthony R. (1999). Septimius Severus: the African emperor. Routledge. ISBN 978-0-415-16591-4.

Journals

- Barnes, T. D. (1967). "The Family and Career of Septimius Severus". Historia: Zeitschrift für Alte Geschichte. 16 (1): 87–107. JSTOR 4434969.
