= Septimius Severus' Parthian campaigns =

194–199 Roman military campaign

- Part of the Roman-Parthian Wars
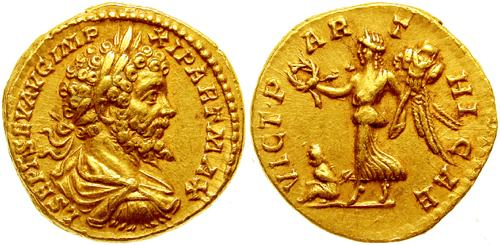
- Aureus of Septimius Severus, struck in 198–200. The reverse coin depicts the goddess Victoria advancing left, commemorating Severus' victory in his Parthian wars
Date	194–199
Location	Armenia, Mesopotamia
Result	Roman victory
Territorial changes	Roman conquest of northern Mesopotamia

Belligerents
Roman Empire; Osroene (195 onwards)	Parthian Empire; Osroene (until 195); Adiabene; Hatra; Armenia

Commanders and leaders
Septimius Severus; Abgar VIII	Vologases V; Abgar VIII; Narsai †; Barsemius; Khosrov I (surrendered)

Strength
30,000 troops A large fleet	Unknown, up to 120,000 troops

Casualties and losses
Unknown, light to moderate	Unknown, very heavy

Septimius Severus' Parthian campaigns (194–199) were a series of military campaigns fought between the Roman Empire, under Emperor Septimius Severus, and the Parthian Empire of Vologases V and its allies, forming part of the long-running Roman–Parthian Wars. Emerging directly from the instability of the Year of the Five Emperors, the conflict was closely tied to the Roman civil wars, as several eastern client kingdoms and Parthian-aligned rulers had supported Severus' rival, Pescennius Niger.

The wars are generally divided into two distinct phases. The first (194–195), also called expeditio Mesopotamena, consisted primarily of punitive expeditions against the client kingdoms of Osroene and Adiabene, which had rebelled during the Roman civil war and attacked Roman positions in Mesopotamia. Severus rapidly reasserted Roman authority, reorganized the region, and established a stronger military presence east of the Euphrates. After a temporary withdrawal to deal with his western rival Clodius Albinus, renewed conflict broke out in 197 when the Parthians launched an invasion of Mesopotamia.

In the second phase (197–199), also called expeditio Parthica, Severus conducted a major offensive deep into Parthian territory, advancing along the Euphrates, capturing key cities such as Seleucia and Babylon, and ultimately sacking the Parthian capital of Ctesiphon in 198. Although this campaign marked a significant Roman victory and led to the annexation of northern Mesopotamia as a province, Severus failed to capture the fortified city of Hatra despite two prolonged sieges.

The wars resulted in the greatest eastern expansion of Roman territory since the campaigns of Trajan, securing Rome's frontier beyond the Euphrates and strengthening imperial control in the Near East. However, the gains proved difficult to sustain in the long term, and the conflict further entrenched the pattern of intermittent warfare between Rome and Parthia that would continue into the 3rd century.

== Sources and nomenclature ==
Despite the survival of three narrative accounts of Septimius Severus' Parthian campaigns, reconstructing the course of the war remains highly problematic. Herodian's account presents particular difficulties for both Parthian campaigns: he entirely omits the first war of 195, erroneously claiming that Severus deferred eastern operations until after his defeat of Clodius Albinus, and he conflates the two separate sieges of Hatra into a single episode. The Historia Augusta reports the wars in a single terse sentence and is almost entirely derivative.

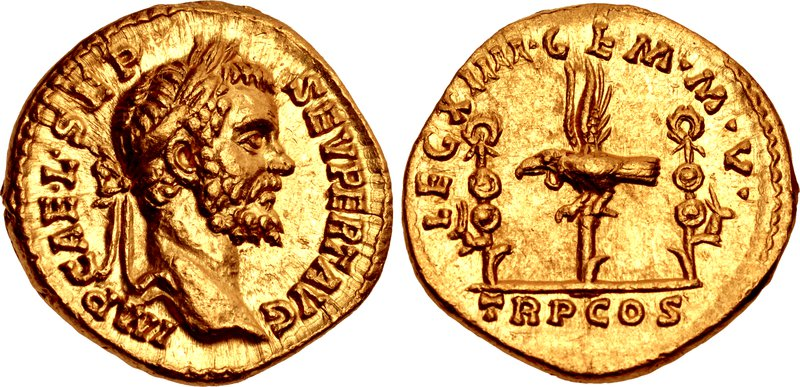
Aureus of Septimius Severus, struck in 193.

Consequently, primary reliance must be placed on the narrative of Cassius Dio, preserved in the epitome of John Xiphilinus and, in one instance, supplemented by an excerpt from the Excerpta Valesiana, which, however, adds little of substance to Xiphilinus' version. Cassius Dio also relied on Severus' autobiography, as he knew the Emperor personally and was a contemporary of his time. However, some pieces of information are missing in his account compared to that of Herodian. Aurelius Victor also present a brief description of the campaign with claims conflicting with those of Cassius Dio.

Beyond the three main narrative accounts, additional evidence comes from inscriptions, coinage, and material remains. The Feriale Duranum, a military calendar recovered from Dura-Europos, fixes the official date of Severus' Parthian victory celebration to 28 January 198. The Arch of Septimius Severus in the Roman Forum, dedicated in 203, preserves a monumental visual record of the eastern campaigns, though its relief panels have been interpreted very differently by scholars and cannot be read straightforwardly as historical evidence.

Epigraphy supplements these sources by attesting provincial arrangements, military commands, and the identity of officials, such as the first praefectus Mesopotamiae, Tiberius Claudius Subatianus Aquila, that the literary sources largely pass over in silence. Several inscriptions refer to the First Parthian War of 194–195 as the expeditio Mesopotamena, and the later Second Parthian War of 197–199 as expeditio Parthica.

== Background ==
=== The Year of the Five Emperors and the Civil Wars ===
The immediate context for Severus' eastern wars was the profound instability that gripped the Roman Empire in 193, known as the "Year of the Five Emperors." The murder of Commodus on 31 December 192 set in motion a rapid succession crisis: Pertinax, acclaimed by the Praetorian Guard, was himself killed after only 87 days when the guardsmen mutinied and auctioned the throne to the highest bidder, Didius Julianus.

Julianus's purchase of power was met with immediate contempt by the army and the urban populace alike, and within weeks three provincial governors had raised their standards: Pescennius Niger in Syria, master of three legions and already being hailed in Rome before his own proclamation; Clodius Albinus in Britannia, commanding three battle-hardened legions; and Septimius Severus in Pannonia Superior, who moved fastest.

Severus neutralised Albinus by offering him the rank of Caesar and nominal status as heir, freeing him to march on Italy. The Senate, faced with Severus's advancing army, condemned Julianus to death and acclaimed Severus emperor before the end of May 193. Severus then turned on Niger, whose eastern support base, including Egypt, was methodically outmanoeuvred. The decisive engagement came at Issus in 194, where Niger's Syrian legions were routed by an outflanking cavalry charge under Valerius Valerianus; Niger fled to Antioch, was captured, and executed.

With Niger eliminated, Severus still had to contend with Albinus. In late 195 Albinus was declared a public enemy, and on 19 February 197 the two armies met outside Lugdunum (Lyon). It was a close-run battle: Albinus's legions initially drew Severus's forces into prepared fieldworks, Severus was unhorsed during the retreat, and only a timely cavalry charge by Julius Laetus turned the tide. Albinus took his own life and his severed head was sent to Rome.

=== Eastern causes of the Parthian wars ===
Several rulers beyond the Euphrates had actively backed Niger: Abgar VIII of Edessa (Osroene) sent troops in his support, the king of Hatra, Barsemius, dispatched archers, Narsai of Arbela (Adiabene), and the Parthian king Vologases V wrote to his satraps ordering them to assemble forces for Niger, though he stopped short of direct intervention. Some of Niger's defeated troops fled across the Tigris into Parthian territory to give military advice to the King.

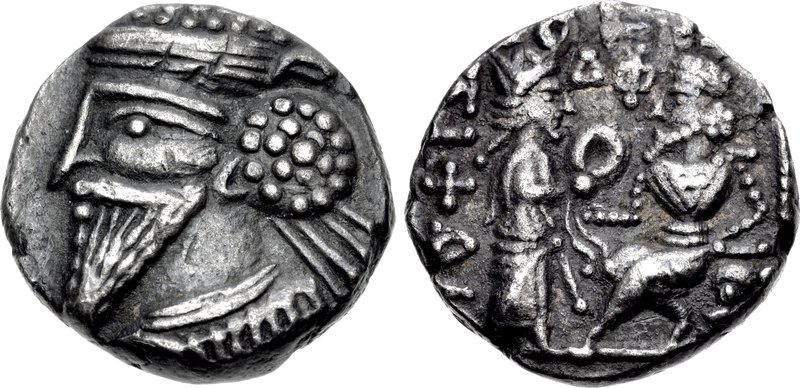
Tetradrachm of Vologases V, struck in 193–194. The reverse coin depicts the king seated on a throne receiving a diadem from Tyche

At the same time, in 194, Osroene and Adiabene, both nominally Parthian vassals and possibly convinced by the Parthian King himself, exploited the Roman civil war to expel and massacre Roman garrisons from northern Mesopotamia and besiege the key frontier city of Nisibis. The garrison at Nisibis held out and declared for Severus after Niger's defeat.

After Niger's death, envoys from Edessa and Arbela sought Severus' pardon, claiming their actions had been directed against Niger's supporters and offering gifts and the return of prisoners. They refused, however, to evacuate the fortresses they had seized or to admit Roman garrisons, and even demanded the withdrawal of remaining Roman forces from the region. Cassius Dio concluded bluntly: "for these reasons this war came about." The Syriac Chronicle of Arbela adds that Vologases V had actively encouraged the revolts of the Osroeni and Adiabeni, though he was prevented from intervening directly by unrest in his own eastern provinces.

Taking advantage of the situation, with the temporary alliance with Albinus still intact, Severus recruited three new legions (Legio I, II, and III Parthicae), and with an army of 30,000 men (roughly six legions), he prepared to invade the cities of Edessa and Hatra. Modern sources suggest that Severus's army may have also included a contingent of Praetorians, led by the Praetorian prefect, Gaius Fulvius Plautianus. (Note: Between the ranks of his army, the brother of the Parthian king Vologases V was also present. He is described in modern sources as a pretender to the Parthian throne, and therefore sought refuge in Severus' army. Nothing of him is known, however some older historians have named him Tiridates, a Parthian nobleman who lived under the later Roman Emperor Caracalla, while other sources reject this interpretation and instead argue that Tiridates and Vologases's brother were not the same person.)

Cassius Dio, echoing his verdict on Trajan's comparable expedition, attributed Severus' true motivation to a desire for glory. Modern historians regard this characterisation as reductive: beyond personal ambition, Severus had compelling strategic reasons to campaign, including the need to rebuild loyalty among Niger's former eastern legions, to demonstrate his military credentials before turning on Albinus, and to pursue a long-term design of pushing the eastern frontier beyond the Euphrates.

== First Parthian War ==
=== Campaigns against Osroene, Adiabene and Hatra ===
In 194, at a time of uncertainty over the succession of power at Rome, King Abgar VIII of Edessa, the capital city of Osroene, besieged the Roman fort of Nisibis, together with the Hatrenene troops, to support Severus' rival Pescennius Niger. The siege was probably part of a revolt fomented by the Parthian king Vologases. After Niger had been captured and killed, in spring or summer of 195, Severus mounted an invasion of Mesopotamia to relieve the city. The Roman army crossed the Euphrates probably near Zeugma, and defeated Abgar's forces.

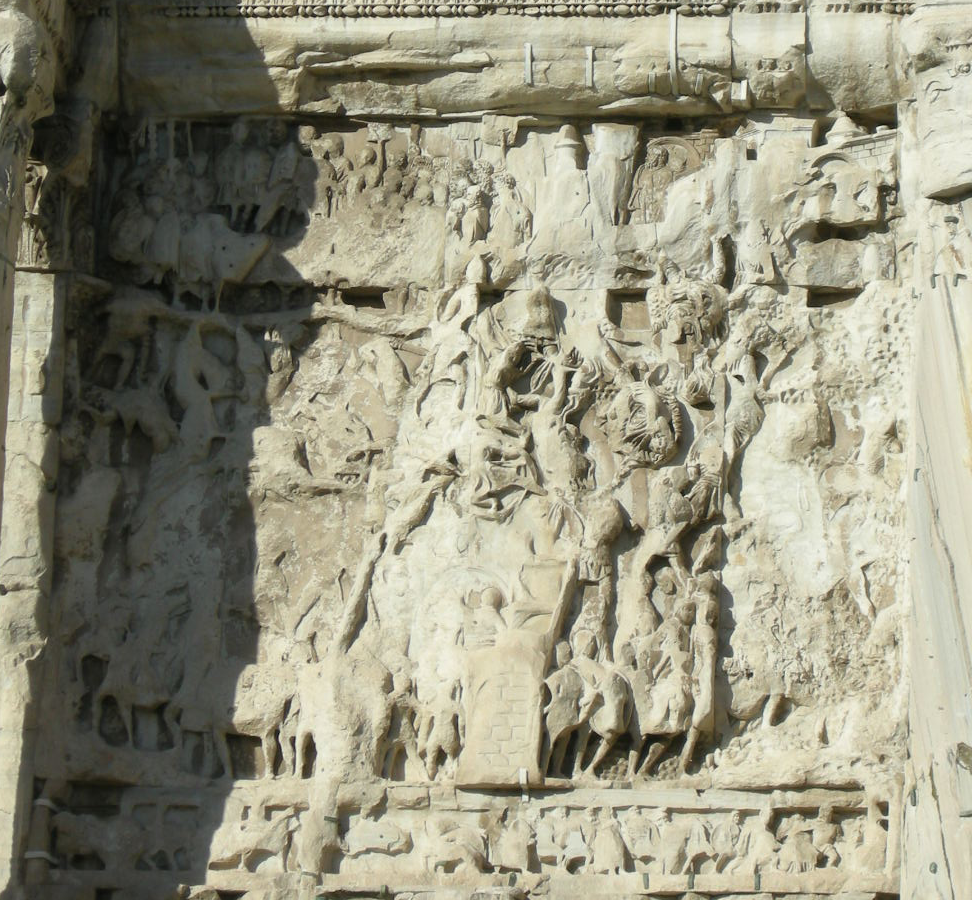
The first panel of the triumphal arch in Rome shows the campaign against Adiabene and Osrhoene

After this defeat, the besiegers sent a delegation to Severus, offering to return all the prisoners and the spoils, according to Cassius Dio. However, they were determined to keep their positions in Mesopotamia and therefore asked Severus to evacuate the region. This proposition was apparently refused by the Emperor who, aiming not only at a demonstration of strength and an assertion of prestige, but also at resolving, in some measure, the now chronic issue of Roman–Parthian relations, then relieved the city from the siege. The Emperor then marched to Edessa, and took the city with little to no resistance.

According to two recently found border stones at Kizilburq, 25 kilometres (16 mi) northwest of Edessa, the territory surrounding Edessa was incorporated into a new Roman province, while the city itself was controlled by Abgar, who had to promise an alliance with Rome. He had adopted Roman names, identified himself with the Roman cause, giving his sons as hostages, and even offering some of his archers to join the Roman army. The city of Nisibis itself was entrusted to a 'knight', identified to be a famed cavalry commander, Valerius Valerianus.

While Severus decided to stay in Nisibis, he divided his army into various columns, under Titus Sextius Lateranus, Tiberius Claudius Candidus, Publius Cornelius Anullinus, Julius Laetus and a certain Probus (possibly Severus' son-in-law). These columns undertook a short campaign, repelling several Arab attacks and conquering an unidentified fortress of relevant importance. The latter might have been conquered by the previous governor of Thrace, Titus Statilius Barbarus. This invasion forced the Hatrenenes and Adiabeni of Arbela to seek peace and offer their submission. (Note: This claim is rejected by Aurelius Victor who states that the territory of the Adiabeni was not worth conquering and therefore not subjugated.)

Due to these victories, the titles of Parthicus Arabicus and Parthicus Adiabenicus, emphasizing that the defeated peoples had been vassals of the Parthians, were assigned to Severus. Notably, the Emperor declined the title Parthicus alone to avoid giving offense to the Parthian king. The absence of Vologases V, as the Parthian monarch was busy putting down rebellions in Persis and Media, may have been the decisive factor for Severus' victory. After a while, according to a fragment by Cassius Dio preserved in the Excerpta Valesiana, the Emperor and Vologases V concluded a truce, and Severus Romans withdrew from Mesopotamia to continue the civil war.

=== Continuation of the civil war in Rome ===
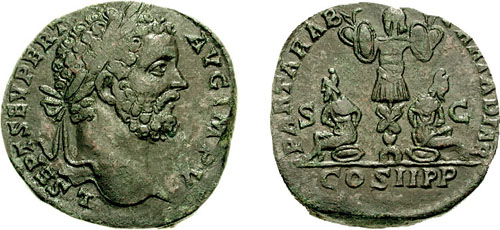
Sestertius of Septimius Severus, struck in 195. The obverse coin depicts two captives seated back to back, on round shields, wearing pointed hats and with their hands bound. (Note: One of the captives is identified as the ruler of Adiabene, Narsai, allied with Parthia. However, this interpretation conflicts with the more widely accepted version of events, in which the ruler was drowned in the Great Zab by the Parthians themselves.)

Severus then moved to strengthen his position as Emperor by claiming to be the son of Marcus Aurelius and brother of Commodus. He also elevated in power his own young son, Bassianus (more commonly known as Caracalla) and bestowed upon him the name Marcus Aurelius Antoninus. This shattered Severus' alliance with Albinus, posing such an obvious threat that Albinus responded by declaring himself Emperor.

The Roman senate declared Albinus a public enemy on December 15, 195. By early 196, Severus had further consolidated his position by installing his ally Publius Cornelius Anullinus as urban prefect of Rome. The stage was now set for civil war between the forces being gathered by Severus and Albinus, which would ultimately culminate in the Battle of Lugdunum on February 19, 197. Albinus had taken his life and with him his supporters were killed.

== Second Parthian War ==
=== Initial Parthian invasion and the Iranian revolt ===
Prompted by the Roman withdrawal from Mesopotamia of 195, Vologases V prepared to launch an invasion of the region. In late summer 197, the Parthians recaptured Armenia swept through northern Mesopotamia and advanced as far as Nisibis, which was then besieged. The city was narrowly saved thanks to the efforts of Julius Laetus, who had commanded the garrison and resisted to the attacks.

Emperor Septimius Severus, having heard of the beginning of the siege, marched through Mesopotamia, initially reoccupying Armenia after the submission of its ruler, Khosrov I, and then through Edessa, receiving tribute, gifts and archers from Abgar VIII, and finally relieving Nisibis from the siege. The Parthians had retreated before Severus could even arrive, and with this he received his tenth imperial acclamation throughout his reign.

The Roman successes had apparently led to an Iranian revolt inside the Parthian Empire. the Parthian monarch advanced with an army of 120,000 men to confront the rebels in Khorasan but, after crossing a small river, his army was surrounded at all sides. During the subsequent Parthian retreat, the rebels killed many Parthians. However, the rebels were then surprised when some of the Parthian horsemen reorganized and pursued them back as far as the Caspian Sea. Following this initial victory, the army of Vologases V met another rebel contingent who had separated from the main army and, after two days of fighting, defeated it.

During this brief revolt, according to the Chronicle of Arbela, the ruler of Adiabene, Narsai, had refused to help Vologases V fighting the rebels and had even started to show signs of alliance with Rome. The Parthian monarch then invaded Adiabene, pillaged its capital, and drowned Narsai in the Great Zab. (Note: The reliability of the Chronicle of Arbela has been questioned by modern historians, though most of them still agree a revolt did take place, and consider it as a major civil war rather than a small revolt. The Battle in the Khorasan region, however, is hardly probable and likely represents an anachronistic embellishment of the account by the author. Most historians place this event right after the relief of Vologases' Siege of Nisibis by Septimius Severus, though some hypotheses suggest 190 as the date of the revolt.)

Following this revolt, Vologases led his army into Mesopotamia and won victories against Roman outposts in the region. Since the Parthian army was not a standing army, but rather consisted of individual contingents of nobles assembled for each expedition, the Kings could only wage war for one season at a time. Vologeses and his army therefore left northern Mesopotamia in the autumn of 196 and returned to Persia.

=== Roman invasion and march along the Euphrates ===
After the relief of the Siege of Nisibis in 197, the Emperor marched along the Euphrates and arrived at Circesium, where his troops started building a fleet. The Roman army marched to Babylon and then Seleucia, and took the cities with no resistance. Seleucia had been destroyed by Avidius Cassius in 165, but capturing it was still necessary to conquer Ctesiphon. A cache of coins dates the arrival of Severus to Seleucia to late summer or early autumn 197.

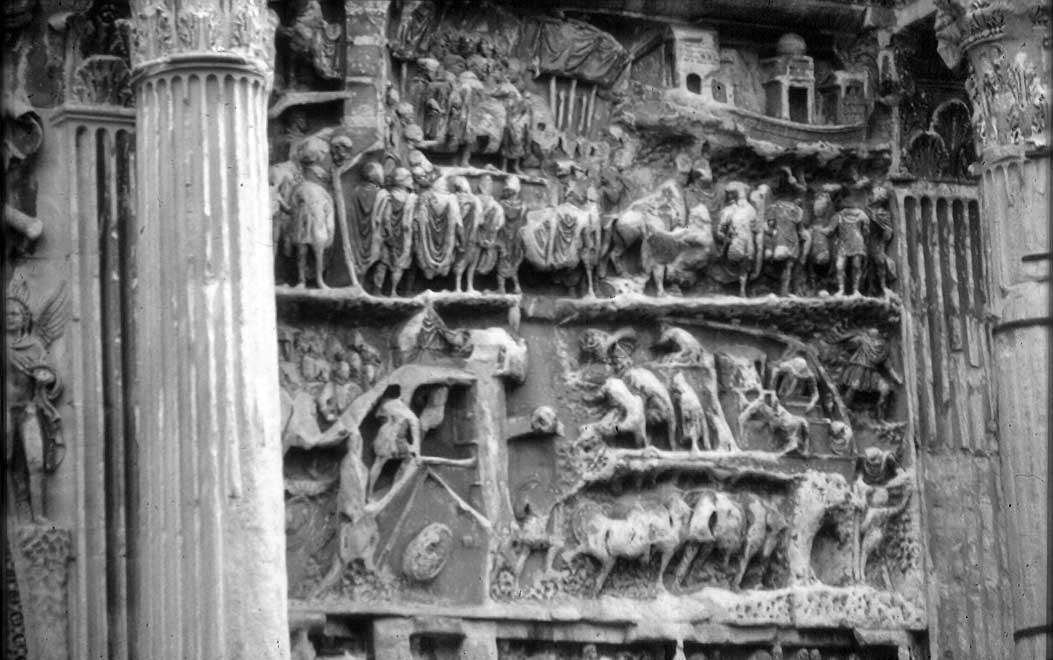
The third panel of the triumphal arch in Rome shows the Siege of Ctesiphon

With Vologases V fleeing Ctesiphon, Severus besieged it. The Parthian capital managed to withstand the siege for several months with considerable resistance, before the final assault on 28 January 198. (Note: The precise date is provided by the Feriale Duranum, a military calendar recovered from Dura-Europos, which reports that the city was captured the fifth day before the Kalends of February (28 January 198).) The Romans, having suffered a shortage of provisions throughout the first phase of the siege, finally pillaged the city and enslaved the people. Cassius Dio records at as many as 100,000 Parthian civilians were taken prisoner and enslaved, while Herodian adds that the royal treasury was captured. The Emperor proclaimed himself as the conqueror of Parthia, and stylized himself as Parthicus Maximus, the same title Emperor Trajan first held.

After this victory, now suffering from a dearth of provisions again, Severus knew he could not stay there for long, and decided to march back into friendly territory. On the way were the loyal cities of Nisibis and Singara, however Hatra stood in the way as the capital of a Parthian vassal kingdom. The Roman Emperor wanted to punish the King Barsemius, who had supported Severus' rival, Pescennius Niger, during the previous Roman civil war. He besieged the city twice, achieving nothing.

=== The two sieges of Hatra ===
Between February and March 198, the first siege began. Contrary to Trajan's siege of Hatra, the attack involved the use of siege engines. However, as many troops were being lost and several siege engines destroyed, disartay began spreading amongst the Roman troops. Some soldiers began to mutiny and two officers were executed under the orders of the Emperor. (Note: The tribune Julius Crispus was the first to be executed, after being reported for quoting Virgil in a way that criticized the campaign, and his accuser, a certain Valerius, was promoted in his place.) Nevertheless, the siege engines were repaired but, failing to make any progress, Severus abandoned the siege and retreated to Nisibis in spring 198. The first attempt had failed, as it wasn't planned very well.

In spring 199, Severus renewed the siege of the city. This attempt was the closest Rome has ever been to conquering the city. Several more siege engines were built, this time by a Bithynian ally, a certain Priscus, specifically for the siege of the Hatra. The Romans encountered initial success, with a part of the city walls tore down. However, the Hatrenene cavalry was prepared, repelling the subsequent Roman assault and then setting fire to siege engines and attacking foraging parties. The Hatrenenes then made use of naphtha to cause disorder among the Roman troops.

With his siege engines burned, Severus ordered his army to withdraw from the assault, hoping to reach a compromise and make the Hatrenenes surrender. The defenders of the city had no intent to open its gates, and when Severus launched the final assault, he was repulsed with even heavier losses. Again, the Emperor executed whoever mutinied, and this time it was Julius Laetus' turn. (Note: The reason for Julius Laetus' execution might be, instead, that his popularity with the troops made them reluctant to fight without him, and likely because he was seen as a potential rival to Severus; afterward, rumors were spread that he had once harbored ambitions to seize power.) The second attempt at capturing Hatra lasted just 20 days, and fared no better than the first attempt. Severus was victorious in war, but Hatra never fell to him.

== Aftermath ==
=== Provincial reorganisation ===
The most durable outcome of Severus' campaigns was the permanent expansion of Roman territory beyond the Euphrates. Two new provinces were established from the conquered territories, creating a buffer intended to shield the existing province of Syria from future Parthian incursions. The province of Osroene is attested by an inscription recording its first procurator, Caius Julius Pacatianus, though the precise date of its foundation remains debated, with some scholars placing it as early as 195 and others following the second campaign. Whether its territory encompassed all of Osroene or only a portion is also unclear, as Abgar VIII of Edessa retained his kingdom and continued to send troops to Severus during the second war, suggesting that at least part of the region remained under client-royal administration.

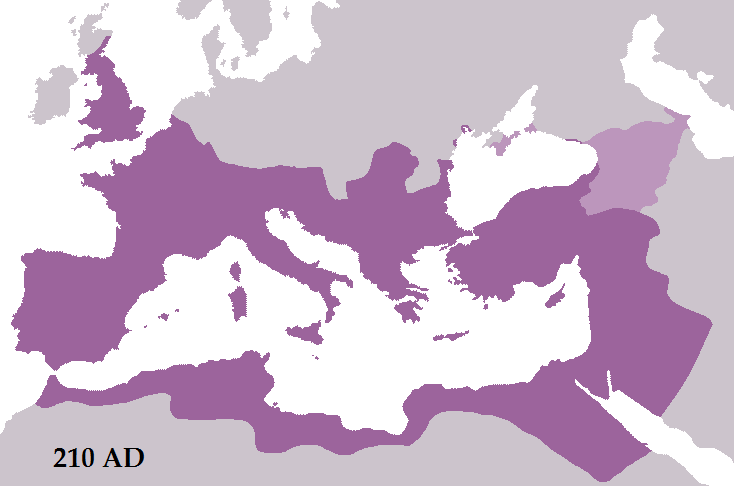
The Roman Empire in 210 after the conquests of Severus, showing Roman territory (purple) and Roman dependencies (light purple)

The province of Mesopotamia was placed under an equestrian praefectus answerable directly to the emperor, mirroring the administrative model applied to Egypt. Its capital was probably Nisibis, which Severus elevated to colonial status and renamed Septimia Nisibis; Singara, already suspected of colonial rank under the Antonines, and Rhesaena, renamed Septimia Rhesaina, were similarly promoted. Carrhae and Palmyra were also granted colonial status. The province was garrisoned by Legio I and Legio III Parthica, two of the three legions Severus had raised specifically for the eastern campaigns. The province encompassed roughly the whole of northern Mesopotamia, bounded by the Euphrates to the west, the Tigris to the east, the Khabur to the south, and the Djebel Sindjar range beyond Thannuris; the Arab city of Hatra remained independent, while Adiabene was reduced to client status beyond the Tigris.

To weaken the military cohesion of a province that had twice served as a base for imperial rivals, Severus divided Syria into two separate provinces: Syria Coele in the north, with Laodicea and then Antioch as its capital, and Syria Phoenice in the south, centred on Tyre.

=== Military and economic consequences ===
The establishment of a permanent Roman presence deep in Mesopotamia had significant economic as well as military ramifications. Aerial photography has revealed a dramatic increase in the number of small Roman forts across the region in this period, stretching from Nabataea through Syria and into northern Iraq. Garrison towns such as Dura-Europos and Anah were reinforced, and the fortifications at Palmyra, Apamea, Tayibeh, and Balad Sinjar were substantially strengthened. These posts were positioned within supporting distance of one another, following established Roman frontier practice.

The increased military presence stimulated local economies through soldiers' pay, the activity of accompanying retinues, and the construction of infrastructure. The sack of Ctesiphon had itself injected considerable funds into the Roman treasury, with many prisoners sold into slavery, reducing the market price of slaves across the empire, while Herodian adds that the Parthian royal treasury was seized. These windfall revenues helped finance Severus' decision, unprecedented in scale, to raise soldiers' pay and to allow troops to marry while on campaign, reforms that enhanced long-term loyalty but also deepened the military's economic footprint in the eastern provinces.

=== Long-term significance ===
Severus' Parthian campaigns represented the greatest permanent expansion of Roman territory in the east since Trajan, and they established the institutional and physical framework of Rome's Mesopotamian frontier for the following generation. However, the gains proved difficult to sustain. Cassius Dio, whose judgement has often been cited approvingly by modern scholars, argued that the new province yielded little revenue while imposing enormous costs, and that by advancing to peoples who were neighbours of the Medes and Parthians, Rome was perpetually fighting wars on others' behalf. The repeated campaigns had further destabilised the Arsacid monarchy: the revolts that repeatedly pulled Vologases V away from the western frontier reflected a kingdom whose feudal structure was fracturing under sustained pressure from both without and within. Within a generation the Parthian Empire had been replaced by the Sasanian Empire, a far more centralised and aggressive successor state, whose emergence would define Roman eastern policy for centuries.

== Bibliography ==
- Bertinelli, Maria (1978). "I Romani oltre l'Eufrate nel II secolo d.C." [The Romans Beyond the Euphrates in the 2nd Century AD]. In Temporini, Hildegard (ed.). Aufstieg und Niedergang der römischen Welt, Band 9/1 [Rise and Fall of the Roman World, Volume 9/1]. De Gruyter. pp. 3–45. ISBN 3-11-006876-1.
- Birley, Anthony (1999). Septimius Severus: The African Emperor. Roman Imperial Biographies Series. Routledge. ISBN 978-0-415-16591-4.
- Campbell, Duncan (1986). "What Happened at Hatra? The Problem of the Severan Siege Operations". In Freeman, Philip; Kennedy, David (eds.). The Defence of the Roman and Byzantine East, Volume II. BAR International Series. BAR Publishing. pp. 51–58. ISBN 0-86054-381-1.
- Chaumont, Marie Louise (1987). "Un document méconnu concernant l'envoi d'un ambassadeur parthe vers Septime Sévère" [A little-known Document concerning the Dispatch of a Parthian Ambassador to Septimius Severus]. Historia: Zeitschrift für Alte Geschichte. 36 (4): 422–447. ISSN 0018-2311. JSTOR 4436026.
- Debevoise, Nelson (1937). A Political History of Parthia. Chicago University Press. OCLC 868027541.
- Gradoni, Mark (2013). "The Parthian Campaigns of Septimius Severus: Causes, and Roles in Dynastic Legitimation". In Brennan, Corey; De Sena, Eric (eds.). The Roman Empire during the Severan Dynasty. Gorgias Press. pp. 1–24. ISBN 978-1-59333-838-1.
- Graham, Daryn (2022). "Septimius Severus, the Parthian Empire, and the East under Rome's Aegis". Kaskal. 19: 295–312. ISSN 2036-5845.
- Hartmann, Udo (2009). "Ein Arsakide Im Heer Des Septimius Severus Überlegungen Zu Den Hintergründen Des Zweiten Partherkrieges" [An Arsacid in the Army of Septimius: Reflections on the Background of the Second Parthian War]. Electrum. 15: 249–266. ISSN 2084-3909.
- Kulikowski, Michael (2016). The Triumph of Empire: The Roman World from Hadrian to Constantine. Harvard University Press. ISBN 978-0-674-65961-2.
- McDowell, Robert Harbold (1935). Coins from Seleucia on the Tigris. Humanistic Series. University of Michigan Press. OCLC 1148622934.
- Rubin, Ze'ev (1975). "Dio, Herodian, and Severus' Second Parthian War". Chiron. 5: 419–442. doi:10.34780/xtc4-1741. ISSN 0069-3715.
- Sage, Michael (2020). Septimius Severus and the Roman Army. Pen & Sword Military. ISBN 978-1-52670-241-8.
- Schlude, Jason (2020). Rome, Parthia, and the Politics of Peace: The Origins of War in the Ancient Middle East. Routledge Studies in Ancient History Series. Routledge. ISBN 978-0-815-35370-6.
- Speidel, Michael (1985). "Valerius Valerianus in Charge of Septimius Severus' Mesopotamian Campaign". Classical Philology. 80 (4): 321–326. doi:10.1086/366941. ISSN 0009-837X. JSTOR 269617.
