= Didia gens =

Ancient Roman family

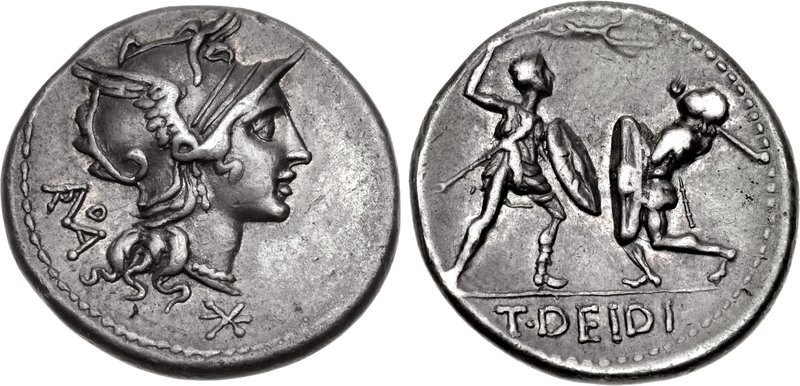
Denarius of Titus Didius, minted in 113 or 112 BC. Roma is portrayed on the obverse, while the reverse depicts two gladiators. It may represent a political promise from Didius to offer gladiatorial shows, should he be elected curule aedile.

The gens Didia, or Deidia, as the name is spelled on coins, was a plebeian family at ancient Rome, which first appears in history during the final century of the Republic. According to Cicero, they were novi homines. Titus Didius obtained the consulship in 98 BC, a dignity shared by no other Didii until imperial times.

== Origin ==
The nomen Didius or Deidius is of uncertain origin. It resembles a class of gentilicia formed from cognomina ending in -idus, but might be derived from a cognomen Dida. Chase classifies it among those gentilicia that either originated at Rome, or cannot be shown to have come from anywhere else. Anthony Birley suggests they came from eastern Italy, "specifically from the coastal town of Histonium." Olli Salomies has documented several examples of Diidiis used as a family name amongst the Oscans.

== Praenomina ==
The earlier Didii used the praenomina Sextus, Titus, and Gaius, to which later members of the family added Quintus, Aulus, and Lucius. All of these were common throughout Roman history.

== Branches and cognomina ==
None of the Didii mentioned during the Republic is known to have borne a cognomen. A number of surnames are found under the Empire, of which the only one that appears to be a family name is Gallus. This cognomen, referring to a cockerel, belongs to an abundant class of cognomina derived from the names of everyday objects and animals. The same surname could also refer to a Gaul, indicating someone of Gaulish descent, or whose appearance or character resembled that of a Gaul.

== Members ==
This list includes abbreviated praenomina. For an explanation of this practice, see filiation.

- Sextus Didius, the grandfather of Titus Didius, the consul of 98 BC.
- Titus Didius Sex. f., tribune of the plebs in 143 BC, was probably the author of the sumptuary law, lex Didia, which was binding on all of Italy, in contrast with the lex Fannia of 161, which had no power except in the city of Rome. He is probably the same Titus Didius who was sent as praetor against the revolted slaves in Sicily, about 138.
- Gaius Didius C. f., a senator in 129 BC.
- Titus Didius T. f. Sex. n., as praetor in 100 BC, triumphed over the Scordisci; consul in 98, he and his colleague passed the lex Caecilia Didia. Afterwards proconsul in Spain, he triumphed over the Celtiberians. Didius fell during the Social War, in the spring of 89.
- Titus Didius (T. f. T. n.), triumvir monetalis in 113 or 112 BC, and tribune of the plebs in 95. He and his colleague, Lucius Aurelius Cotta, were forced from the tribunal hearing the disputes arising from the accusation brought against Caepio.
- Gaius Didius, legate of Caesar in 46 BC. In command of Caesar's fleet during Caesar's 46 BC Spanish campaign. He won a naval victory over Publius Attius Varus. After the Battle of Munda Didius pursued Gnaeus Pompeius's fleet escaping from Carteia, capturing or destroying his ships. After the death of Gnaeus, Didius was attacked and slain by his quarry's Lusitanian soldiers.
- Quintus Didius, governor of Syria in 31 BC. Although probably appointed by Marcus Antonius, he went over to Octavian after the Battle of Actium, and persuaded the Arabs to burn a fleet that Antonius had built in the Red Sea.
- Aulus Didius Postumus, proconsul of Cyprus during the reign of Augustus.
- Aulus Didius Gallus consul suffectus in AD 39, and subsequently governor of Britain.
- Didius Scaeva, one of the generals of Vitellius, who was slain at the taking of the Capitol in AD 69.
- Aulus Didius Gallus Fabricius Veiento, praetor during the reign of Nero, he was banished for publishing a number of libels, and for supposedly selling the honours granted by the emperor. He subsequently returned to Rome, and was consul at least twice, the second time under Titus in AD 80. Aurelius Victor reports that he was a favourite of Domitian, under whom he was consul.
- Gaius Pomponius Gallus Didius Rufus, proconsul of Crete and Cyrenaica in 88/89.
- Titus Didius Secundus, consul suffectus under Trajan in AD 102.
- Lucius Didius Marinus, the second husband of Annia Cornificia Faustina Minor, daughter of the emperor Marcus Aurelius.
- Quintus Petronius Didius Q. f. Severus, father of the emperor Didius Julianus.
- Marcus Didius Q. f. Q. n. Severus Julianus, consul in AD 175 and 179, and Roman emperor for nine weeks in AD 193.
- Didius Q. f. Q. n. Proculus, brother of the emperor Didius Julianus.
- Didius Q. f. Q. n. Nummius Albinus, brother of the emperor Didius Julianus.
- Didia M. f. Q. n. Clara, daughter and only child of Didius Julianus.

== See also ==
- List of Roman gentes

== Bibliography ==
- Marcus Tullius Cicero, De Domo Sua, De Oratore, In Pisonem, Philippicae, Pro Murena, Pro Plancio, Pro Sestio.
- Gaius Julius Caesar, De Bello Hispaniensis (On the War in Spain, attributed).
- Publius Ovidius Naso (Ovid), Fasti.
- Marcus Velleius Paterculus, Compendium of Roman History.
- Lucius Annaeus Florus, Epitome de T. Livio Bellorum Omnium Annorum DCC (Epitome of Livy: All the Wars of Seven Hundred Years).
- Appianus Alexandrinus (Appian), Hispanica (The Spanish Wars), Bellum Civile (The Civil War).
- Aulus Gellius, Noctes Atticae (Attic Nights).
- Lucius Cassius Dio Cocceianus (Cassius Dio), Roman History.
- Eusebius of Caesarea, Chronicon.
- Ammianus Marcellinus, Res Gestae.
- Ambrosius Theodosius Macrobius, Saturnalia.
- Scholia Bobiensia (Bobbio Scholiast), In Ciceronis Pro Sestio (Commentary on Cicero's Oration Pro Sestio).
- Dictionary of Greek and Roman Biography and Mythology, William Smith, ed., Little, Brown and Company, Boston (1849).
- René Cagnat et alii, L'Année épigraphique (The Year in Epigraphy, abbreviated AE), Presses Universitaires de France (1888–present).
- George Davis Chase, "The Origin of Roman Praenomina", in Harvard Studies in Classical Philology, vol. VIII, pp. 103–184 (1897).
- Robert K. Sherk, "The Text of the Senatus Consultum De Agro Pergameno", in Greek, Roman, and Byzantine Studies, vol. 7, pp. 361–369 (1966).
- Michael Crawford, Roman Republican Coinage, Cambridge University Press (1974, 2001).
- Paul A. Gallivan, "The Fasti for A.D. 70–96", in Classical Quarterly, vol. 31, pp. 186–220 (1981).
- John C. Traupman, The New College Latin & English Dictionary, Bantam Books, New York (1995).
- Olli Salomies, "The Nomina of the Samnites. A Checklist", in Arctos, vol. 46, pp. 137–185 (2012).
