= Titus Flavius Genialis =

Roman Praetorian prefect

Titus Flavius Genialis (Latin: T. Flavius Genialis) was Praetorian prefect with Tullius Crispinus in 193 AD. He was appointed by Didius Julianus, who had just bought the throne from the Guard. Even in the face of Julianus' rapidly deteriorating political position, Genialis remained utterly loyal. However, he could not prevent the Senate from condemning or executing Julianus as they did on behalf of Septimius Severus who succeeded Julianus as Emperor of Rome.

In 185, Genialis appears to have been tribunus cohortis, or commander, of a presumably praetorian cohort.

== Inscriptions ==
- CIL VI, 214

== Sources ==
- Historia Augusta, Life of Didius Julianus
- Matthew Bunson, Encyclopedia of the Roman Empire, p. 238

Political offices
Preceded by Quintus Aemilius Laetus	Praetorian prefect of the Roman Empire; 193; With: Tullius Crispinus	Succeeded by Flavius Juvenalis
