= Manlia Scantilla =

Roman empress in 193

- Augusta
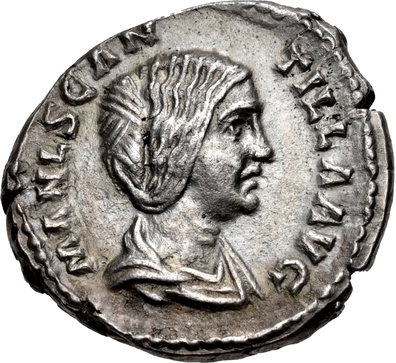
- Coin featuring Manlia Scantilla

Roman empress
- Tenure: Three months in 193
- Spouse: Emperor Didius Julianus
- Issue: Didia Clara
Names
- Manlia Scantilla
Regnal name
- Manlia Scantilla Augusta

Manlia Scantilla (fl. 193) was a Roman woman who lived in the second century. She was very briefly Roman Empress as wife to the Roman emperor Didius Julianus. Her name indicates that she was born into the gens Manlia, which if correct, indicates an illustrious patrician ancestry.

Manlia Scantilla married the senator Didius Julianus before his succession. Around 153, she bore Julianus a daughter and only child, Didia Clara, who was known for her beauty.

Her husband became emperor on 28 March 193 (known as "Year of the Five Emperors"). On that day, Scantilla and her daughter were awarded the title of Augusta by decree of the Roman Senate. Scantilla enjoyed her title and status for less than three months because Julianus was killed on 1 June 193. The new emperor, Septimius Severus, removed her status and title as Augusta, but gave Scantilla and her daughter the former emperor's body for burial. The two women buried Julianus in a tomb alongside his great-grandfather, outside of Rome. Within a month of Severus' accession to the throne, Scantilla died in obscurity. The fate of Didia Clara is unknown.

Royal titles
Preceded by Flavia Titiana	Empress of Rome; 193	Succeeded by Julia Domna
