= Cornelius Repentinus =

2nd-century Roman senator and official

Cornelius Repentinus was a Roman Senator who was active in the 2nd century AD. He held a number of positions during the reigns of emperors Marcus Aurelius, Commodus and Didius Julianus, which included suffect consul and Urban prefect of Rome.

Repentinus was the son of Sextus Cornelius Repentinus, was prefect of the Praetorian Guard during the reign of Roman emperors Antoninus Pius (reigned 138–161) and Marcus Aurelius (reigned 161–180).

== Career ==
At some point before 193, when the emperor Commodus was assassinated, Repentinus acceded to the suffect consulate. Paul Leunissen suggests this was around the year 188. Leunissen is one of many scholars who suggest that a headless and fragmentary inscription recovered in El Kef in Tunisia provides details of Repentinus' cursus honorum. (This identification has been questioned in an article by Werner Eck.) Leunissen argues that this inscription not only confirms that Repentinus was consul and urban prefect, but that during the co-reigns of Marcus Aurelius and Commodus, Repentinus was curator of the Via Flaminia (which would be between 177 and 180), then after an unknown appointment (possibly commander of a legion) he served as governor of the imperial province of Lusitania. Leunissen dates the tenure of this governor, regardless of his identity with Repentinus, possibly from 185 to 188.

In the first months of 193, Repentinus married the daughter of Didius Julianus, Didia Clara. When the emperor Pertinax was murdered on 28 March, according to the Historia Augusta, Julianus and Repentinus were outside the senate house where they had been summoned, finding the doors were locked. Two tribunes informed the pair that Titus Flavius Claudius Sulpicianus was at the camp of the Praetorian Guard seeking their support to become emperor; Repentinus was one of a group who encouraged Julianus to compete for the purple, and the tribunes led them to the camp where Julianus outbid Sulpicianus and became emperor. One of his first acts was to appoint Repentinus urban prefect. Despite the fact that Julianus was never secure on the throne, Repentinus remained a firm supporter of his father-in-law his entire reign; reportedly he and the praetorian prefect Titus Flavius Genialis were the only two with Julianus at the end.

The fate of Cornelius Repentinus and his wife after the death of his father-in-law is unknown.
