= Quintus Petronius Didius Severus =

Father of Roman emperor Didius Julianus

Quintus Petronius Didius Severus was a Roman who lived in the 2nd century. Severus' family was one of the most prominent and significant families in Midolanensis or Mediolanum (modern Milan, Italy).

Severus was of the gens Petronia. His father, Quintus Petronius Severus, born c. 70 AD, was a distinguished General and had a sister named Petronia Vara, born c. 75 AD. His mother was Didia Jucunda, of the gens Didia, thus explaining the use of both gentile names in his own, as became the custom around this time. His paternal grandfather Quintus Petronius, son of one Gaius Petronius, was an Insuber or Insubrian in the city. His grandfather, father, aunt and Severus himself were born and raised in Mediolanensis.

Severus married Aemilia Clara, an African woman from Hadrumetum. Their sons were:

- Didius Proculus, married, his son was betrothed to his niece Didia Clara.
- Didius Nummius Albinus
- Marcus Didius Severus Julianus, 137 AD, best known as Didius Julianus, briefly Roman Emperor in 193 AD.
