= Siege of Hatra (197–198) =

Siege Part of the Roman–Parthian War of 194–198

- Part of Roman–Parthian War of 194–198
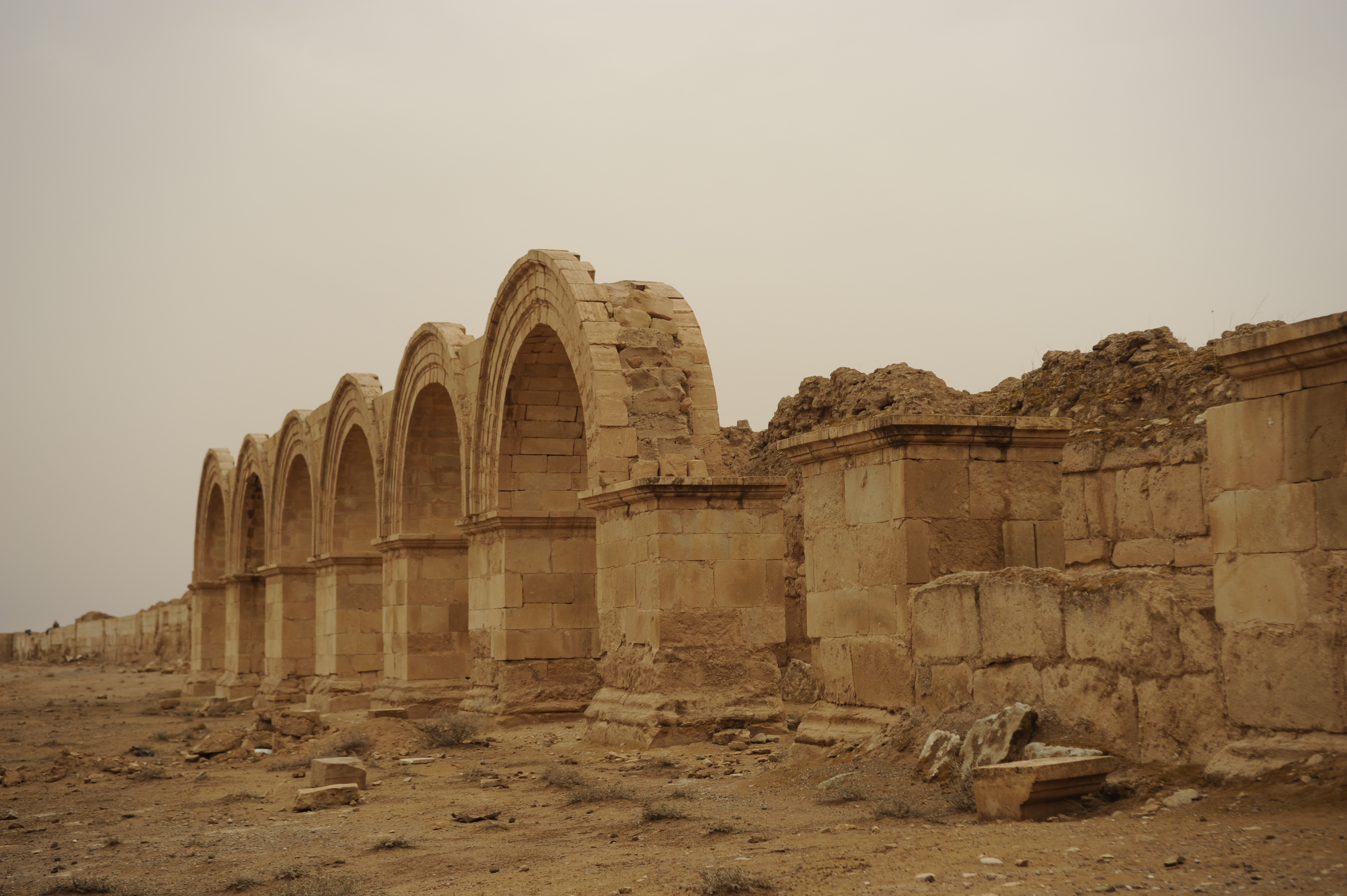
- The ruins of Hatra
Date	c. 197 or 197–198
Location	Hatra, northern Mesopotamia 35°35′17″N 42°43′6″E
Result	Hatrene-Parthian victory

Belligerents
Parthian Empire; Kingdom of Hatra	Roman Empire

The siege of Hatra in 197–198 was the second siege of Hatra by Septimius Severus during the Roman–Parthian War of 194–198. He wanted to conquer Hatra because there was a temple there that had great wealth. However, this was without success, as many of his machines had been destroyed and many of his men were wounded. He abandoned the siege and withdrew his forces to Syria

== Sources ==
- Pirnia, Hasan; Ashtiani, Abbas Iqbal; Babaei, Parviz (2012). History of Persia (in Persian). Negah Publications. ISBN 978-9643513320.
- Chaumont, M. L.; Schippmann, K. (1988). "Balāš". In Yarshater, Ehsan (ed.). Encyclopædia Iranica. Vol. III/6: Baḵtīārī tribe II–Banān. London and New York: Routledge & Kegan Paul. pp. 574–580. ISBN 978-0-71009-118-5.
- Foundation, Encyclopaedia Iranica. "Welcome to Encyclopaedia Iranica". iranicaonline.org.
