= Tullius Crispinus =

Roman Praetorian Prefect (died 193)

Tullius Crispinus was Praetorian Prefect with Titus Flavius Genialis in 193 AD. He was appointed by Didius Julianus, who had just bought the throne from the guard. Didius Julianus had planned to name Septimius Severus his co-emperor and sent Crispinus to deliver the offer. Severus killed him and thus declined the offer.

== Sources ==
- Historia Augusta, Life of Didius Julianus
- Anthony R. Birley, Septimius Severus: The African Emperor, p. 99
- Anthony R. Birley, Lives of the Later Caesars, pp. 197-198

Political offices
Preceded by Quintus Aemilius Laetus	Praetorian prefect of the Roman Empire; 193; With: Titus Flavius Genialis	Succeeded by Flavius Juvenalis
