= Battle of Ctesiphon (198) =

Battle fought between the Roman and Parthian empires (198)

- Part of the Roman-Persian Wars
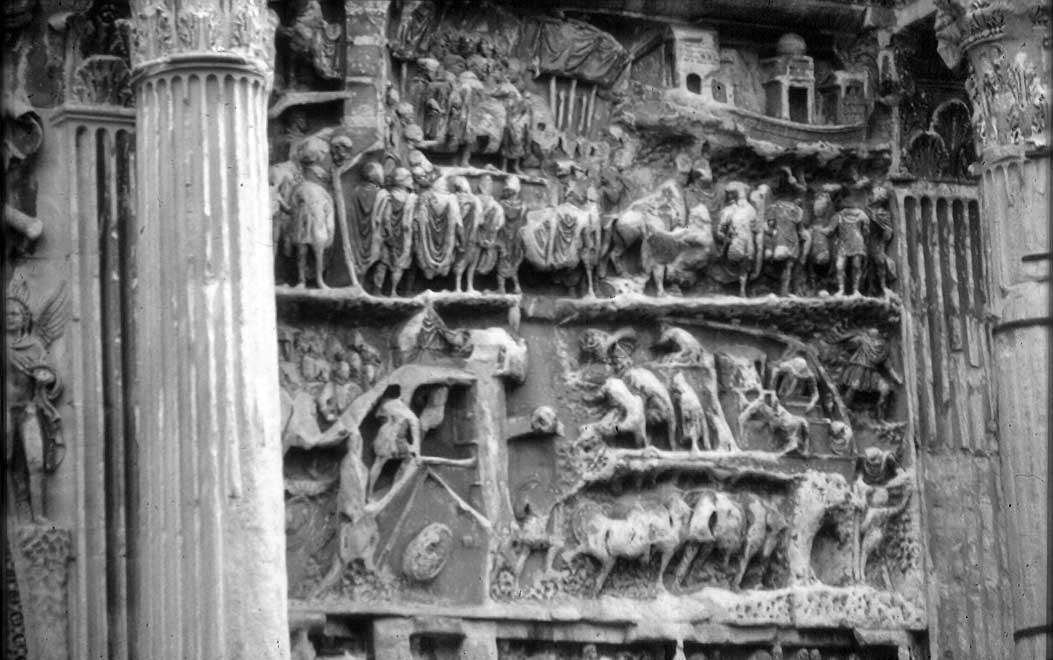
- Siege of Ctesiphon, relief on the Arch of Septimius Severus
Date	198
Location	Ctesiphon, Mesopotamia
Result	Roman victory

Belligerents
Severan Dynasty	Parthian Empire

Commanders and leaders
Septimius Severus	Vologases V

The Battle of Ctesiphon was a battle fought between the Roman and Parthian empires. The Roman emperor Septimius Severus, faced by fierce resistance, succeeded in sacking the Parthian capital, and also deported some of its inhabitants.

== Sources ==
- Daryaee, Touraj (2010). "Ardashir and the Sasanians' Rise to Power". Anabasis: Studia Classica et Orienta. University of California: 236–255.
- Kröger, Jens (1993). "Ctesiphon". Encyclopaedia Iranica, Vol. IV, Fasc. 4. pp. 446–448.
