= Quintus Didius =

Roman governor of the province of Syria

Quintus Didius was a Roman governor of the province Syria (31 BC to 29 BC).

Octavian, the later Emperor Augustus, won the decisive Battle of Actium against Mark Antony and Cleopatra VII. Then – at the end of 31 BC – he sent Didius as governor to Syria. If Octavian conquered Egypt, Cleopatra wanted to escape to India with a fleet, which she had pulled through a silty canal into the Red Sea, but Didius induced Malchos, the king of the Nabataeans, to stop her plan by setting her ships on fire.

The Jewish king Herod the Great, meanwhile, changed sides from Antony to Octavian. Now Herodes supported Didius militarily when the governor of Syria blocked Antony's gladiators on their way from Cyzicus in northwest Asia Minor to their leader in Egypt. Didius forced the gladiators to surrender and settle themselves in Daphne, a suburb of the town of Antioch.
