= Didia Clara =

Daughter of Roman Emperor Didius Julianus

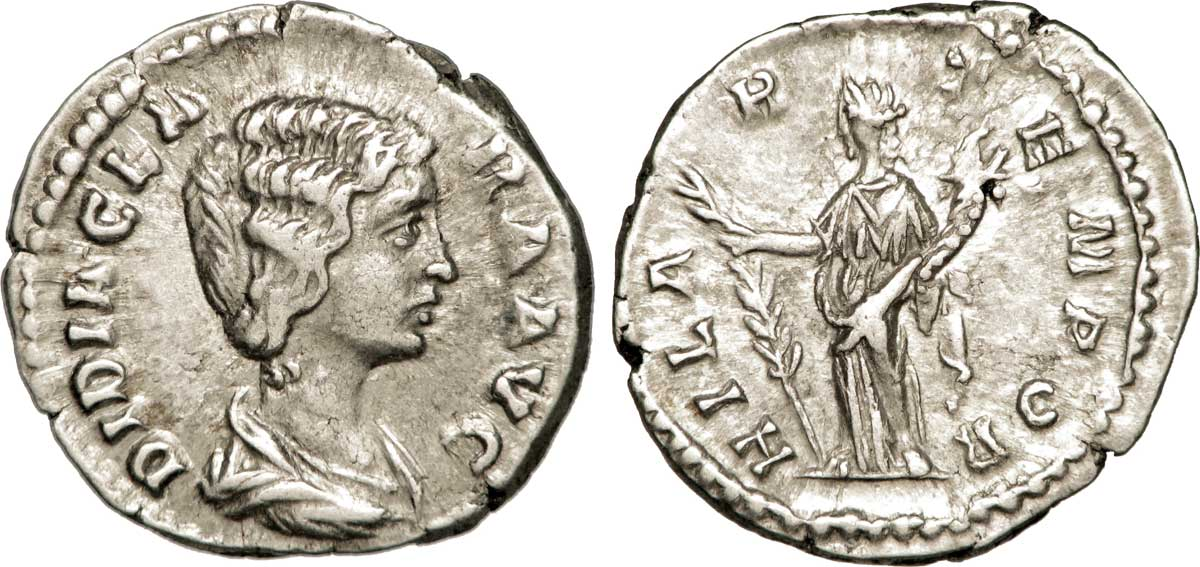
Didia Clara

Didia Clara was a daughter and the only recorded child of the Roman emperor Didius Julianus and empress Manlia Scantilla. She was born and raised in Rome. Little is known about her personality or life.

After Didius Julianus purchased the throne of the Roman Empire at an auction held by the praetorian guardsmen early in 193, he was accorded the title of Augustus by the Senate. Clara and her mother both received the title of Augusta. The author of the Historia Augusta reports the two women received the honors "with both trepidation and reluctance as if they already foresaw catastrophe"; however, Herodian claims they were primary instigators of his bid to power.

During the brief reign of Pertinax, she married Cornelius Repentinus, who served as prefect of Rome during the brief period that her father reigned, starting 28 March 193. When her father died on 1 June 193, the new emperor Septimius Severus removed her title. Within a month, her mother died. Didia Clara survived her parents; however her fate afterwards is unknown.
