= Didius Julianus =

Roman emperor in 193

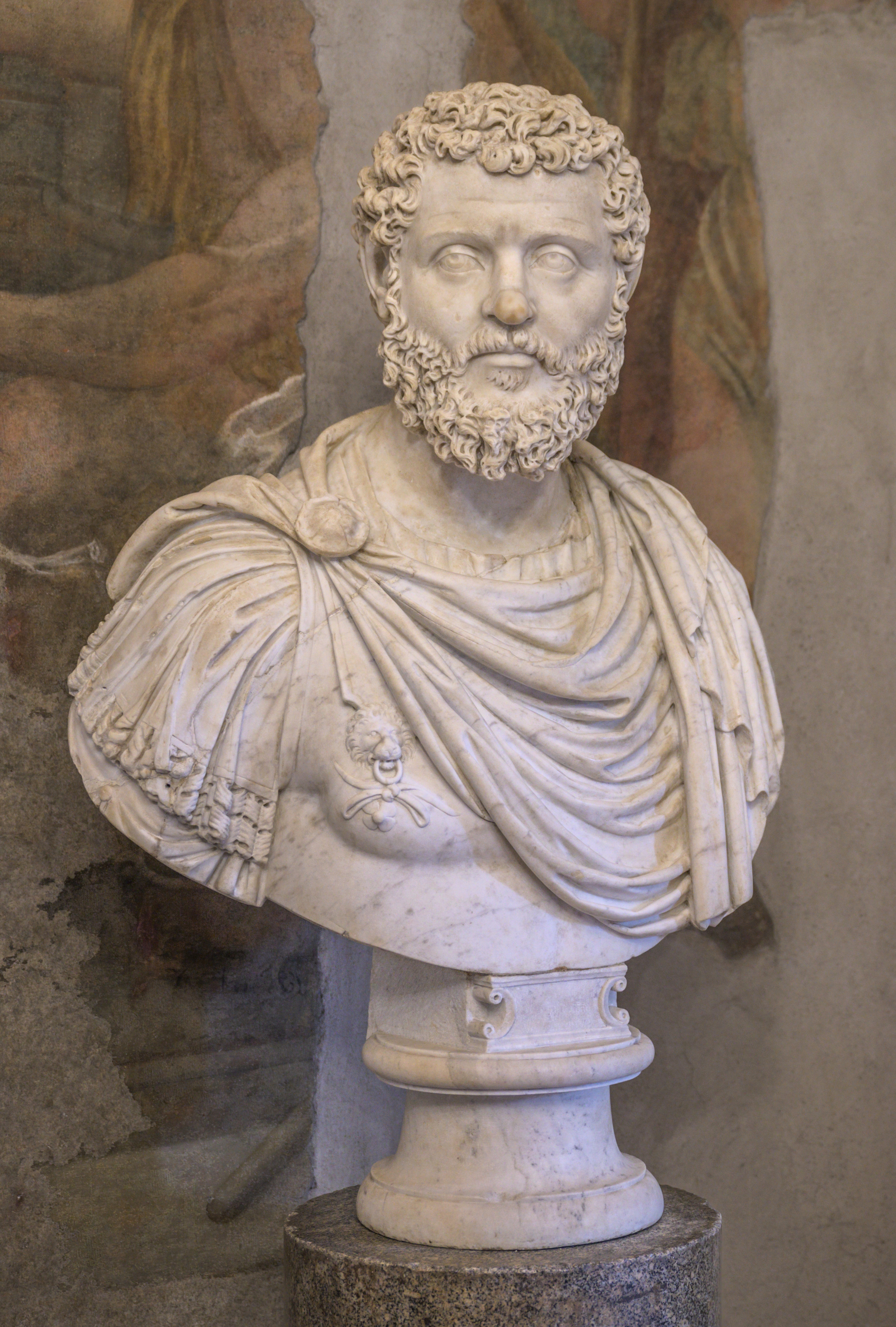
- Bust, Capitoline Museums, Rome

Roman emperor
- Reign: 28 March – 2 June 193
- Predecessor: Pertinax
- Successor: Septimius Severus
- Born: 29 January 133; Mediolanum, Italy
- Died: 2 June 193 (aged 60); Rome, Italy
- Spouse: Manlia Scantilla
- Issue: Didia Clara
Names
- Marcus Didius Julianus
Regnal name
- Imperator Caesar Marcus Didius Severus Julianus Augustus
- Father: Quintus Petronius Didius Severus
- Mother: Aemilia Clara

Marcus Didius Julianus (/ˈdɪdiəs/; 29 January 133 – 2 June 193) was Roman emperor from March to June 193, during the Year of the Five Emperors. He is known for having purchased the title of emperor in an auction run by the Praetorian Guard. His reign is a common delineation in the decline and fall of the Roman Empire.

Julianus had a successful political career, governing several provinces, including Dalmatia and Germania Inferior, and defeating two Germanic tribes, the Chauci and Chatti. He was appointed to the consulship in 175 along with Pertinax as a reward, before being demoted by Commodus.

Julianus became emperor after winning an auction held by the Praetorian Guard, who had assassinated his predecessor Pertinax. A civil war ensued in which three rival generals laid claim to the imperial throne. Septimius Severus, commander of the legions in Pannonia and the nearest of the generals to Rome, marched on the capital, gathering support along the way and routing cohorts of the Praetorian Guard Julianus sent to meet him. Abandoned by the Senate and the Praetorian Guard, Julianus was killed by a soldier in the palace and succeeded by Severus.

== Early life ==
Julianus was born to Quintus Petronius Didius Severus and Aemilia Clara. His father came from a prominent family in Mediolanum, modern-day Milan, and his mother was a North African woman of Roman descent, from a family of consular rank. His brothers were Didius Proculus and Didius Nummius Albinus. His date of birth was 29 January, the year was 133 according to Cassius Dio and 137 by the less reliable Historia Augusta. Didius Julianus was raised by Domitia Calvilla, mother of the emperor Marcus Aurelius. With Domitia's help, he was appointed at a very early age to the vigintivirate, the first step towards public distinction. He married a Roman woman named Manlia Scantilla, and sometime around 153, they had a daughter, Didia Clara, their only child.

== Imperial service ==
In succession Julianus held the offices of quaestor and aedile, and then, around 162, was named as praetor. He was nominated to the command of the Legio XXII Primigenia in Mogontiacum (now Mainz). In 170, he became praefectus of Gallia Belgica and served for five years. After repelling an invasion by the Chauci, a tribe dwelling in the drainage basin of the river Weser and northwestern coastal area of present-day Germany, he was raised to the consulship in 175 along with Pertinax. He further distinguished himself in a campaign against the Chatti, governed Dalmatia and Germania Inferior. He was then made prefect, charged with distributing money to the poor of Italy. Modern historians generally consider this a demotion for political reasons, as Commodus, the Roman Emperor at the time, feared Julianus' growing power. It was around this time that he was charged with having conspired against the life of Commodus, but the jury acquitted him and instead punished his accuser. Afterwards, he governed Bithynia and succeeded Pertinax as the proconsul of North Africa.

== Emperor ==
=== Rise to power ===
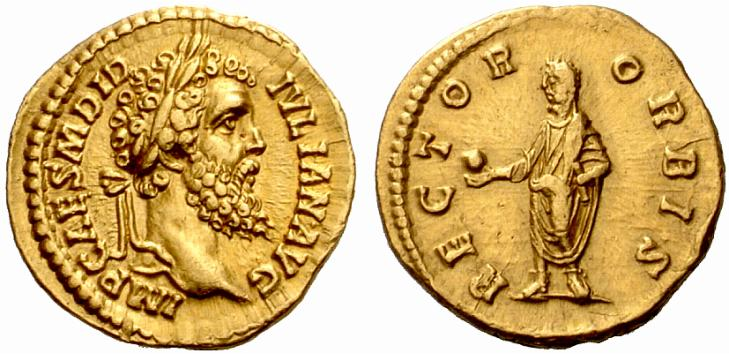
Aureus of Didius Julianus with the caption IMP CAES M DID – IVLIAN AVG.

After the murder of Pertinax on 28 March 193, the Praetorian guard announced that the throne was to be sold to the man who would pay the highest price. Titus Flavius Claudius Sulpicianus, prefect of Rome and Pertinax's father-in-law, who was in the Praetorian camp ostensibly to calm the troops, began making offers for the throne. Meanwhile, Julianus also arrived at the camp, and since his entrance was barred, shouted out offers to the guard. After hours of bidding, Sulpicianus promised 20,000 sesterces to every soldier; Julianus, fearing that Sulpicianus would gain the throne, then offered 25,000. The guards closed with the offer of Julianus, threw open the gates, and proclaimed him emperor. Threatened by the military, the Senate also declared him emperor. His wife and his daughter both received the title Augusta.

=== Reign and opposition ===
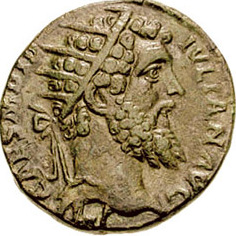
Dupondius of Julianus. Inscription: CAES. M. DIDI. IVLIAN. AVG.

Upon his accession, Julianus immediately reversed Pertinax's monetary reforms by devaluing the Roman currency. Pertinax had increased the silver content of the denarius to 87%, whereas Didius Julianus ordered it reduced to 75%, nearly the adulterated amount that was present during the reign of Commodus. Because Julianus bought his position rather than acquiring it conventionally through succession or conquest, he was a deeply unpopular emperor. When Julianus appeared in public, he frequently was greeted with groans and shouts of "robber and parricide". Once, a mob even obstructed his progress to the Capitol by pelting him with large stones. When news of the public anger in Rome spread across the Empire, three influential generals, Pescennius Niger in Syria, Septimius Severus in Pannonia, and Clodius Albinus in Britain, each able to muster three legions, rebelled. They refused to accept Julianus' authority as emperor and instead each declared himself emperor. Julianus declared Severus a public enemy because he was the nearest of the three to Rome, making him the most dangerous foe. Julianus sent senators to persuade Severus' legionaries to abandon him, a new general was nominated to replace him, and a centurion dispatched to take Severus' life.

The Praetorian Guard had rarely fought in field battles, so Julianus marched them into the Campus Martius and drilled the guard in the construction of fortifications and field works. Despite this training, the Praetorian Guard was still undertrained compared to the field legionaries of Severus. Severus first secured the support of Albinus, declaring him Caesar, and then seized Ravenna and its fleet. Severus killed Tullius Crispinus, the Praetorian prefect, who was sent to negotiate with Severus and slow his march on Rome, and won over to his cause the ambassadors sent to turn his troops. Cassius Dio maintained that the Praetorian Guard tried to fight back, but were crushed, while modern historians believe that the Praetorian Guard simply abandoned Julianus, deserting en masse.

Julianus attempted to negotiate with Severus, offering to share the empire with his rival, but Severus ignored these overtures and pressed forward. As he marched, more and more cities in Italy supported his claim to the throne. The remnants of the Praetorian Guard received pardons from Severus in exchange for surrendering the actual murderers of Pertinax. After seizing the ringleaders and killing them, the soldiers reported what they had done to Marcus Silius Messala, the consul, who summoned the senate to inform them of the proceedings. The Senate passed a motion proclaiming Severus emperor, awarded divine honours to Pertinax, and sentenced Julianus to death. Julianus was deserted by all except one of the prefects and his son-in-law, Cornelius Repentinus.

=== Death ===
Julianus was killed in the palace by a soldier on 2 June 193 AD, after a mere 66 days of ruling. According to the contemporary Roman historian Cassius Dio, Julianus' last words were: "But what evil have I done? Whom have I killed?" His body was given to his wife and daughter, who buried it in his great-grandfather's tomb by the fifth milestone on the Via Labicana. The Senate passed a damnatio memoriae motion to condemn Julianus and his legacy. Severus dismissed the Praetorian Guard and executed the soldiers who had killed Pertinax, the previous emperor.

== Legacy ==
Julianus repelled invasions by the Chatti and the Chauci, both of which helped protect Rome's border provinces. In the long run, the two tribes he repelled were but the harbingers of far larger Germanic migrations that would only truly finish in the sixth century AD. From arguably the reign of Marcus Aurelius, Rome would be constantly subject to incursions from the descendants of these tribes (see Crisis of the Third Century and Migration Period). As emperor, Didius Julianus was unable to pass any major policy reforms in his short reign other than currency devaluation. While the currency devaluation was comparatively minor, he restarted the trend of devaluing the Roman currency which had abated under Pertinax's reign. The trend he started, which would continue under the Severan dynasty on a far larger scale, destroyed confidence in Rome's currency, led to rampant hyperinflation, and caused widespread economic upheaval. Moreover, his blatant purchase of the throne shattered any illusions of normality in the Roman Empire.

== Popular culture ==
In the movie The Fall of The Roman Empire, Julianus is played by Eric Porter and depicted as a scheming henchman of Commodus. At the end of the movie, Julianus and Pescennius Niger, played by Douglas Wilmer, another crony of Commodus, compete against each other in the auction for the throne of Rome.

Julianus' accession and short reign are alluded to in the novel The Business by Scottish writer Iain Banks.

== Sources ==
- Dio Cassius, Roman History, Epitome of Book LXXIV, 11–17
- Hammond, Mason (1957). "Imperial Elements in the Formula of the Roman Emperors during the First Two and a Half Centuries of the Empire". Memoirs of the American Academy in Rome. 25: 19–64. doi:10.2307/4238646. JSTOR 4238646.
- Historia Augusta, Didius Julianus
- Herodian, Roman History, ii.6–13
- Meckler, Michael L., "Didius Julianus (193 A.D.)", De Imperatoribus Romanis
- Wotawa, August von, "Didius 8", Realencyclopädie der classischen Altertumswissenschaft, volume 9 (V.1), Metzlerscher Verlag (Stuttgart, 1903), columns 412–424.

Regnal titles
Preceded by Pertinax	Roman emperor 193	Succeeded by Septimius Severus
Political offices
Preceded by L. Calpurnius Piso; P. Salvius Julianus	Roman consul 175 with Pertinax	Succeeded by T. Pomponius Proculus Vitrasius Pollio II; M. Flavius Aper II
