= Septimius Severus =

Roman emperor from 193 to 211

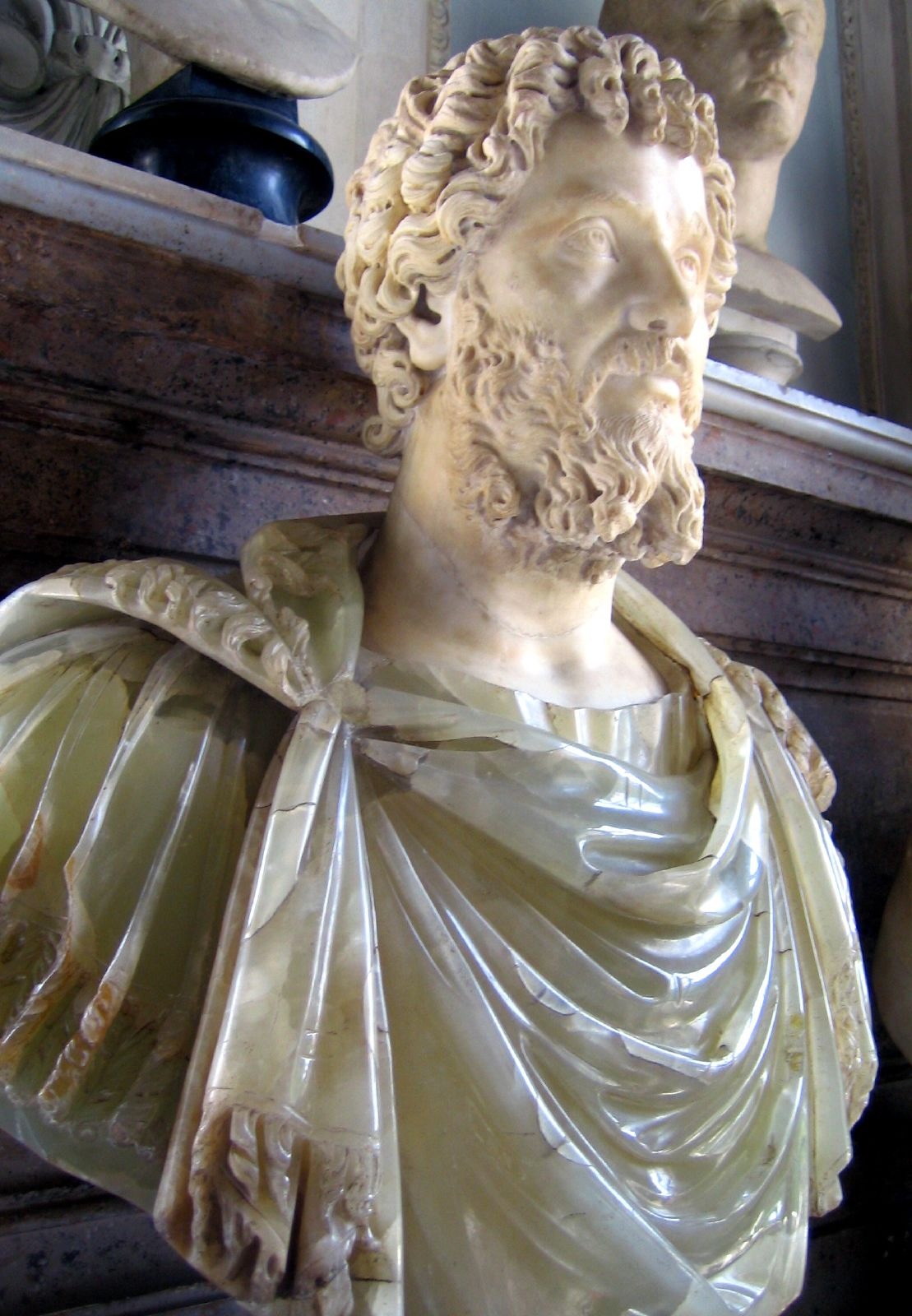
- Roman alabaster and marble bust of Septimius Severus, Musei Capitolini

Roman emperor
- Reign: 9 April 193 – 4 February 211
- Predecessor: Didius Julianus
- Successors: Caracalla and Geta
- Co-emperors: Caracalla (198–211); Geta (209–211)
- Rivals: Pescennius Niger; Clodius Albinus
- Born: Lucius Septimius Severus; 11 April 145; Leptis Magna, Africa Proconsularis
- Died: 4 February 211 (aged 65); Eboracum, Britain
- Spouses: Paccia Marciana (m. c. 175; died c. 186); Julia Domna (m. 187)
- Issue: Caracalla; Geta
Regnal name
- Imperator Caesar Lucius Septimius Severus Pertinax Augustus
- Dynasty: Severan
- Father: Publius Septimius Geta
- Mother: Fulvia Pia

Lucius Septimius Severus (/səˈvɪərəs/; Latin: [ˈluːkius sepˈtimius seˈweːrus]; 11 April 145 – 4 February 211) was Roman emperor from 193 to 211. He was born in Leptis Magna, Libya, in the Roman province of Africa. He is of Libyco-Punic descent on his father's side and Romano-Italian on his mother's side. As a young man, he advanced through the customary succession of offices during the reigns of Marcus Aurelius and Commodus. Severus was the final contender to seize power after the death of the emperor Pertinax in 193 during the Year of the Five Emperors.

After deposing and killing the incumbent emperor Didius Julianus, Severus fought his rival claimants, the Roman generals Pescennius Niger and Clodius Albinus. Niger was defeated in 194 at the Battle of Issus in Cilicia. Later that year Severus waged a short punitive campaign beyond the eastern frontier, annexing the Kingdom of Osroene as a new province. Severus defeated Albinus three years later at the Battle of Lugdunum in Gaul. Following the consolidation of his rule over the western provinces, Severus waged another brief, more successful war in the east against the Parthian Empire, sacking their capital Ctesiphon in 197 and expanding the eastern frontier to the Tigris. He then enlarged and fortified the Limes Arabicus in Arabia Petraea. In 202, he campaigned in Africa and Mauretania against the Garamantes, capturing their capital Garama, and expanding the Limes Tripolitanus along the southern desert frontier of the empire.

With his second wife, Julia Domna, Severus had two sons; the elder, Caracalla, was proclaimed Augustus, or co-emperor, in 198, and the younger, Geta, in 209. Severus travelled to Britain in 208, strengthening Hadrian's Wall and reoccupying the Antonine Wall. In 209, he invaded Caledonia (modern Scotland) with an army of 50,000 men but his ambitions were cut short when he died of an infectious disease in early 211, at Eboracum (modern York). His sons, advised by Julia Domna, succeeded him, thus founding the Severan dynasty. It was the last dynasty of the Roman Empire before the Crisis of the Third Century.

== Early life ==
=== Family and education ===
Born on 11 April 145 at Leptis Magna (in present-day Libya) as the son of Publius Septimius Geta and Fulvia Pia, Septimius Severus came from a wealthy and distinguished family of equestrian rank. On his mother's side he descended from the Italian Fulvii and on his father's side from a family of Libyan-Punic origin. He was described as "Libyan by race" by the 12th-century poet John Tzetzes. Due to his family background he is considered the first provincial emperor, as he was the first emperor born not only in the provinces but also into a provincial family of non-Italian origin. Severus's father, an obscure provincial, held no major political status, but he had two cousins, Publius Septimius Aper and Gaius Septimius Severus, who served as consuls under the emperor Antoninus Pius r. 138–161. His mother's ancestors had moved from Italy to North Africa; they belonged to the gens Fulvia, an Italian patrician family that originated in Tusculum.

Septimius Severus had two siblings: an elder brother, Publius Septimius Geta; and a younger sister, Septimia Octavilla. Severus's maternal cousin was the praetorian prefect and consul Gaius Fulvius Plautianus. Septimius Severus grew up in Leptis Magna and was a native Punic speaker, but he was also educated in Latin and Greek, which he spoke with a slight accent. Little else is known of the young Severus's education but, according to Cassius Dio, the boy had been eager for more education than he actually received. Presumably, Severus received lessons in oratory: at the age of 17, he gave his first public speech.

=== Public service ===
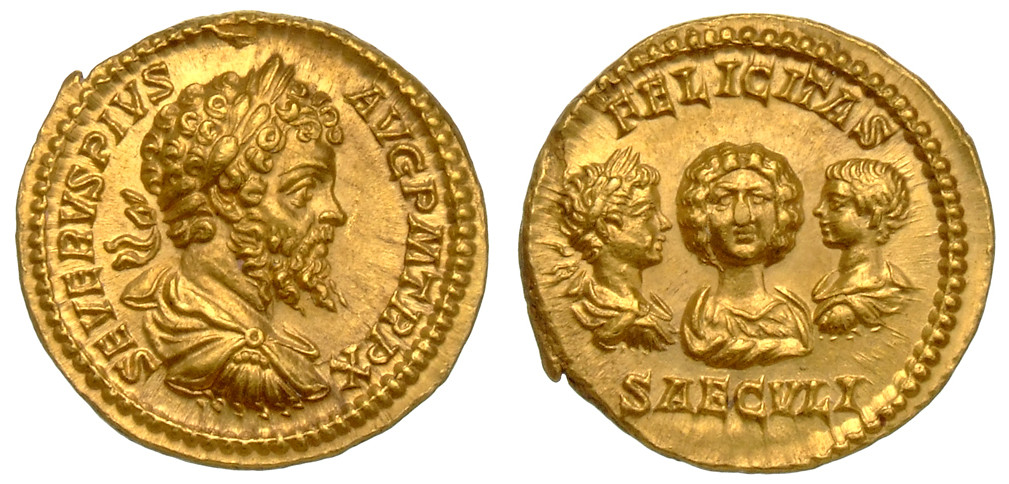
Dynastic aureus of Septimius Severus, minted in 202. The reverse feature the portraits of Geta (right), Julia Domna (centre) and Caracalla (left). Inscription: SEVERUS PIUS AVG[USTUS] P[ONTIFEX] M[AXIMUS], TR[IBUNICIA] P[OTESTAS] X / FELICITAS SAECVLI.

Severus sought a public career in Rome in around 162. At the recommendation of his relative Gaius Septimius Severus, the emperor Marcus Aurelius (r. 161–180) granted him entry into the senatorial ranks. Membership in the senatorial order was a prerequisite to attain positions within the cursus honorum and to gain entry into the Roman Senate. Nevertheless, it appears that Severus's career during the 160s met with some difficulties.

It is likely that he served as a vigintivir in Rome, overseeing road maintenance in or near the city, and he may have appeared in court as an advocate. At the time of Marcus Aurelius, he was the State Attorney (Advocatus fisci). However, he omitted the military tribunate from the cursus honorum and had to delay his quaestorship until he had reached the required minimum age of 25. To make matters worse, the Antonine Plague swept through the capital in 166.

With his career at a halt, Severus decided to temporarily return to Leptis, where the climate was healthier. According to the Historia Augusta, a usually unreliable source, he was prosecuted for adultery during this time but the case was ultimately dismissed. At the end of 169, Severus was of the required age to become a quaestor and journeyed back to Rome. On 5 December, he took office and was officially enrolled in the Roman Senate. Between 170 and 180 his activities went largely unrecorded, in spite of the fact that he occupied an impressive number of posts in quick succession. The Antonine Plague had thinned the senatorial ranks and, with capable men now in short supply, Severus's career advanced more steadily than it otherwise might have.

The sudden death of his father necessitated another return to Leptis Magna to settle family affairs. Before he was able to leave Africa, Mauri tribesmen invaded southern Spain. Control of the province was handed over to the emperor, while the Senate gained temporary control of Sardinia as compensation. Thus, Septimius Severus spent the remainder of his second term as quaestor on the island of Sardinia.

In 173, Severus's cousin Gaius Septimius Severus was appointed proconsul of the province of Africa Proconsularis and chose Severus as one of his two legati pro praetore, a senior military appointment. Following the end of this term, Septimius Severus returned to Rome, taking up office as tribune of the plebs, a senior legislative position, with the distinction of being the candidatus of the emperor.

=== Marriages ===
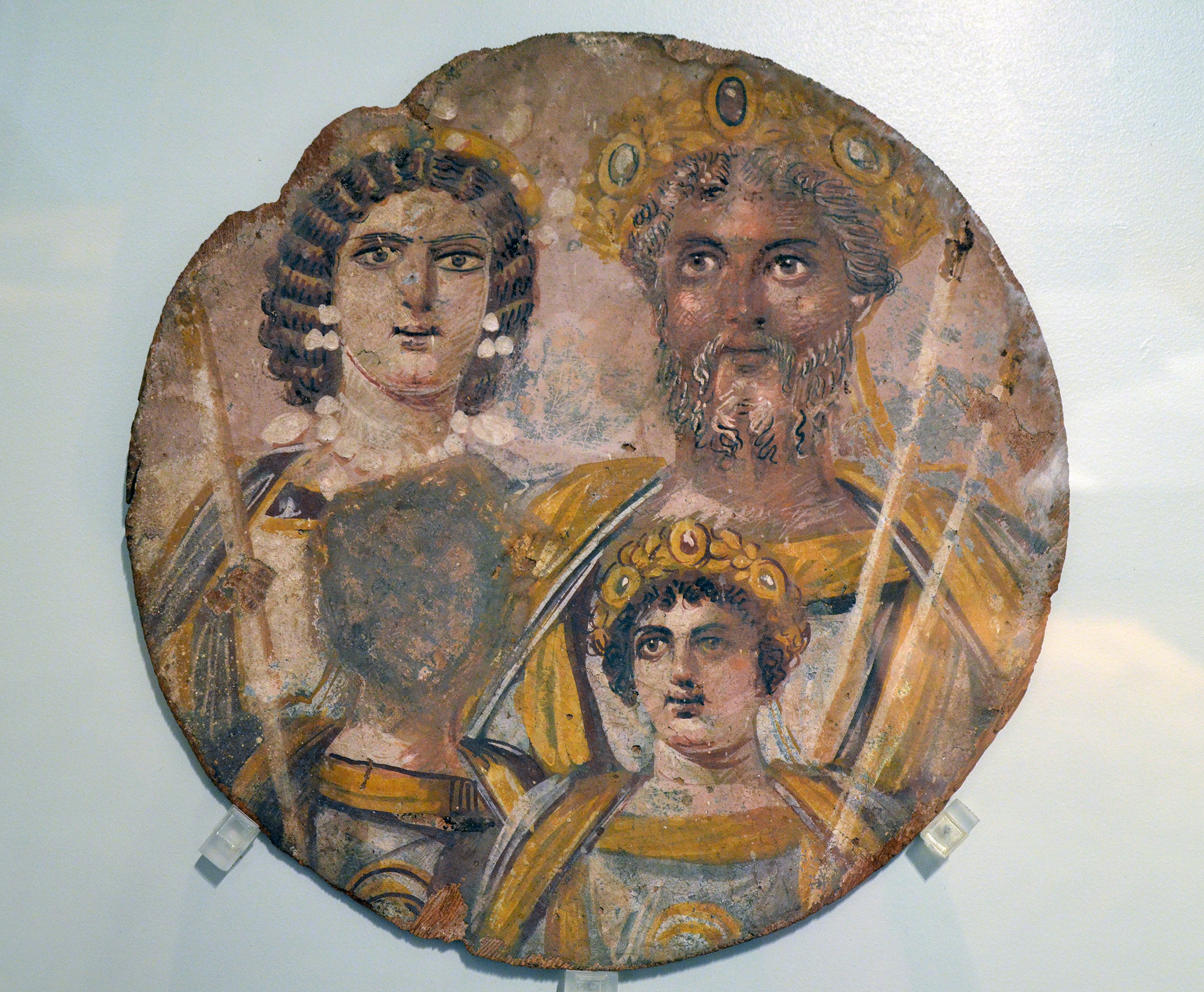
The Severan Tondo, c. 199, Severus, Julia Domna, Caracalla and Geta, whose face has been erased as part of his damnatio memoriae by Caracalla (Antikensammlung Berlin)

About 175, Septimius Severus, in his early thirties at the time, contracted his first marriage, to Paccia Marciana, a woman from Leptis Magna. He probably met her during his tenure as legate under his uncle. Marciana's name suggests Punic or Libyan origin, but nothing else is known of her. Septimius Severus does not mention her in his autobiography, though he commemorated her with statues when he became emperor. The unreliable Historia Augusta claims that Marciana and Severus had two daughters, but no other attestation of them has survived. It appears that the marriage produced no surviving children, despite lasting for more than ten years.

Marciana died of natural causes around 186. Septimius Severus, now in his forties, childless and eager to remarry, began enquiring into the horoscopes of prospective brides. The Historia Augusta relates that he heard of a woman in Syria of whom it had been foretold that she would marry a king, and so Severus sought her as his wife. This woman was an Emesene Syrian named Julia Domna. Her father, Julius Bassianus, descended from the Arab Emesene dynasty and served as a high priest to the local cult of the sun god Elagabal. Domna's older sister, Julia Maesa, would become the grandmother of the future emperors Elagabalus and Alexander Severus.

Bassianus accepted Severus's marriage proposal in early 187, and in the summer the couple married in Lugdunum (modern-day Lyon, France), of which Severus was the governor. The marriage proved happy, and Severus cherished Julia and her political opinions. Julia built "the most splendid reputation" by applying herself to letters and philosophy. They had two sons, Lucius Septimius Bassianus (later nicknamed Caracalla, born 4 April 188 in Lugdunum) and Publius Septimius Geta (born 7 March 189 in Rome).

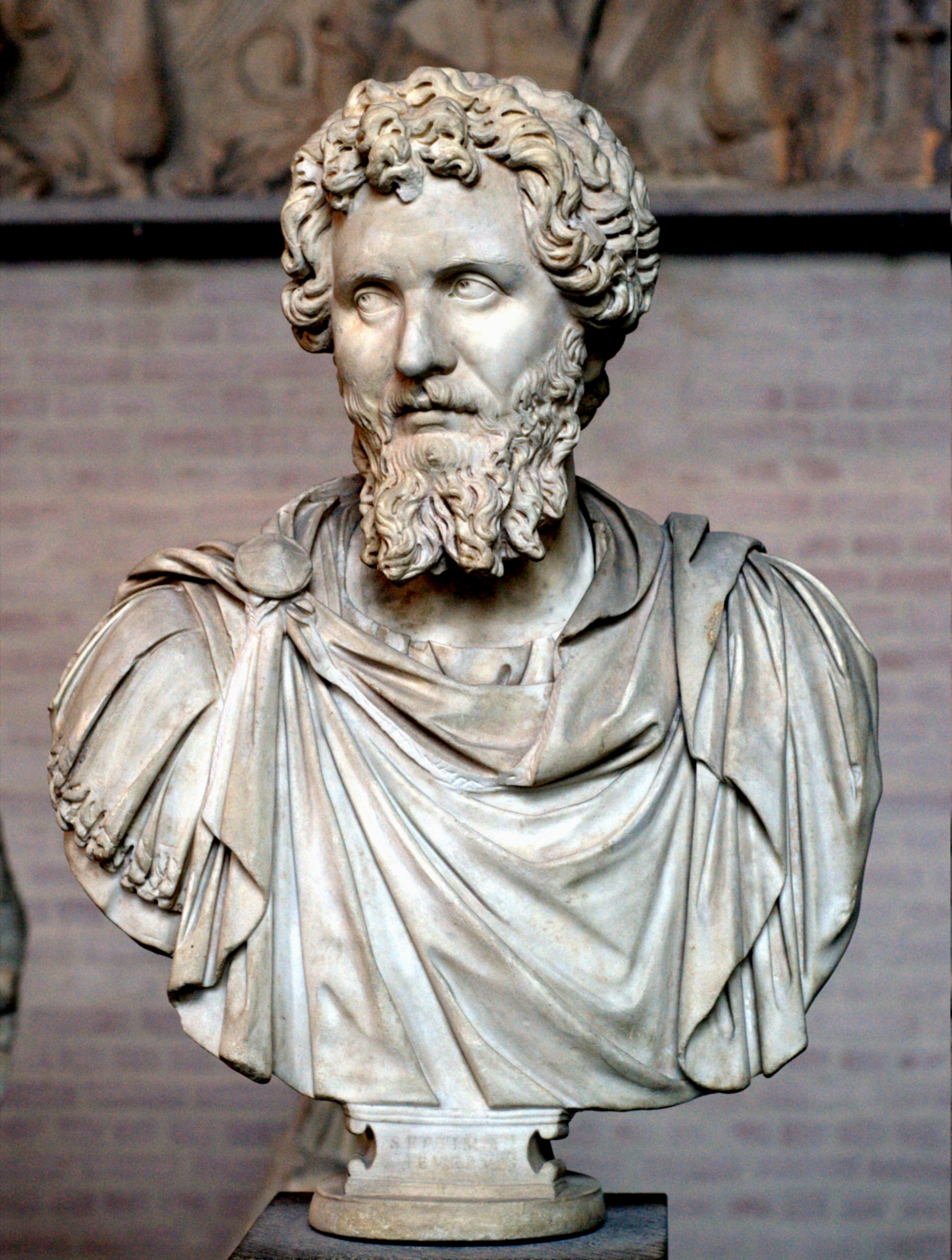

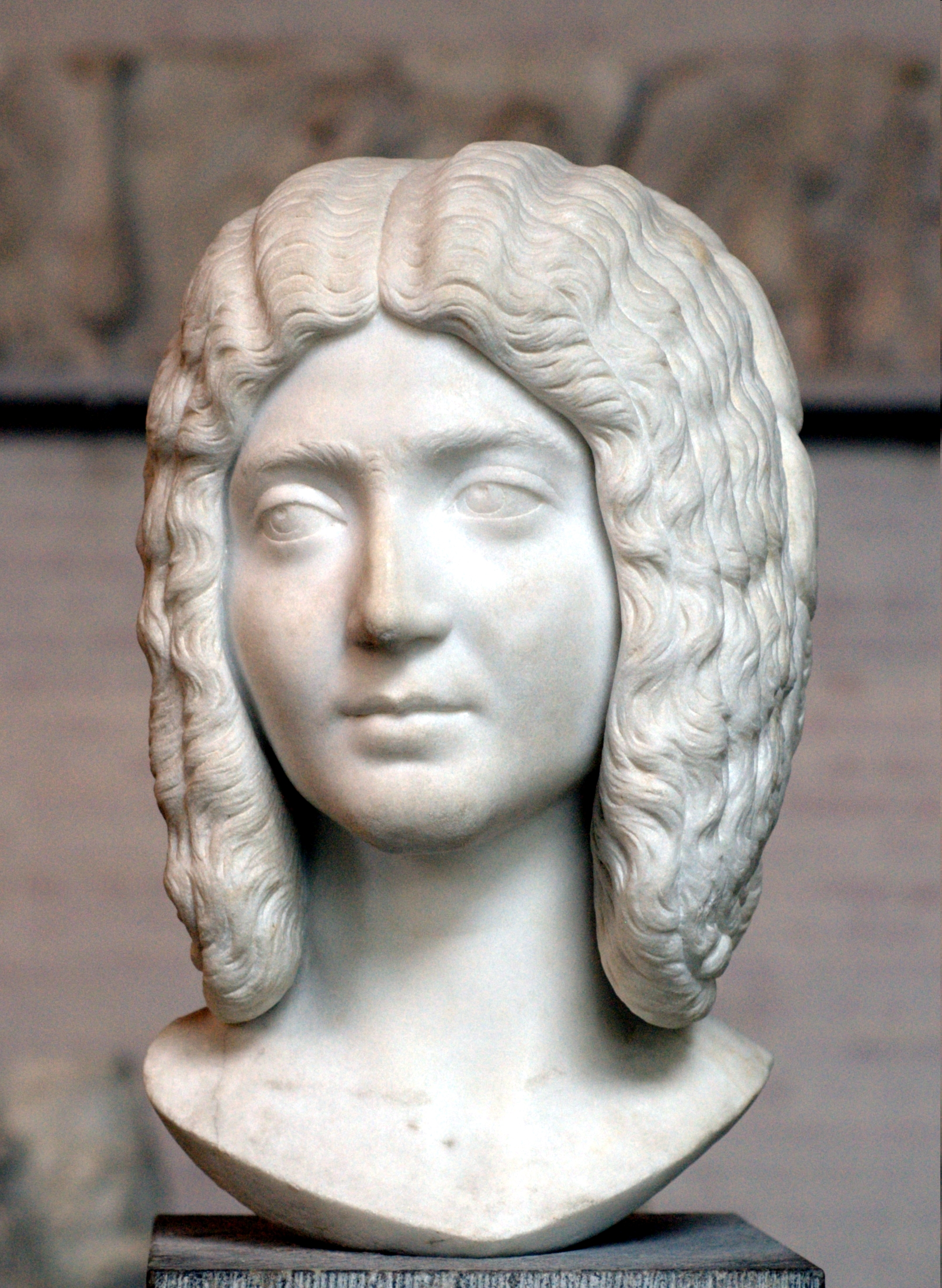
Busts of Septimius Severus (left) and Julia Domna (right), Munich Glyptotek

== Rise to power ==
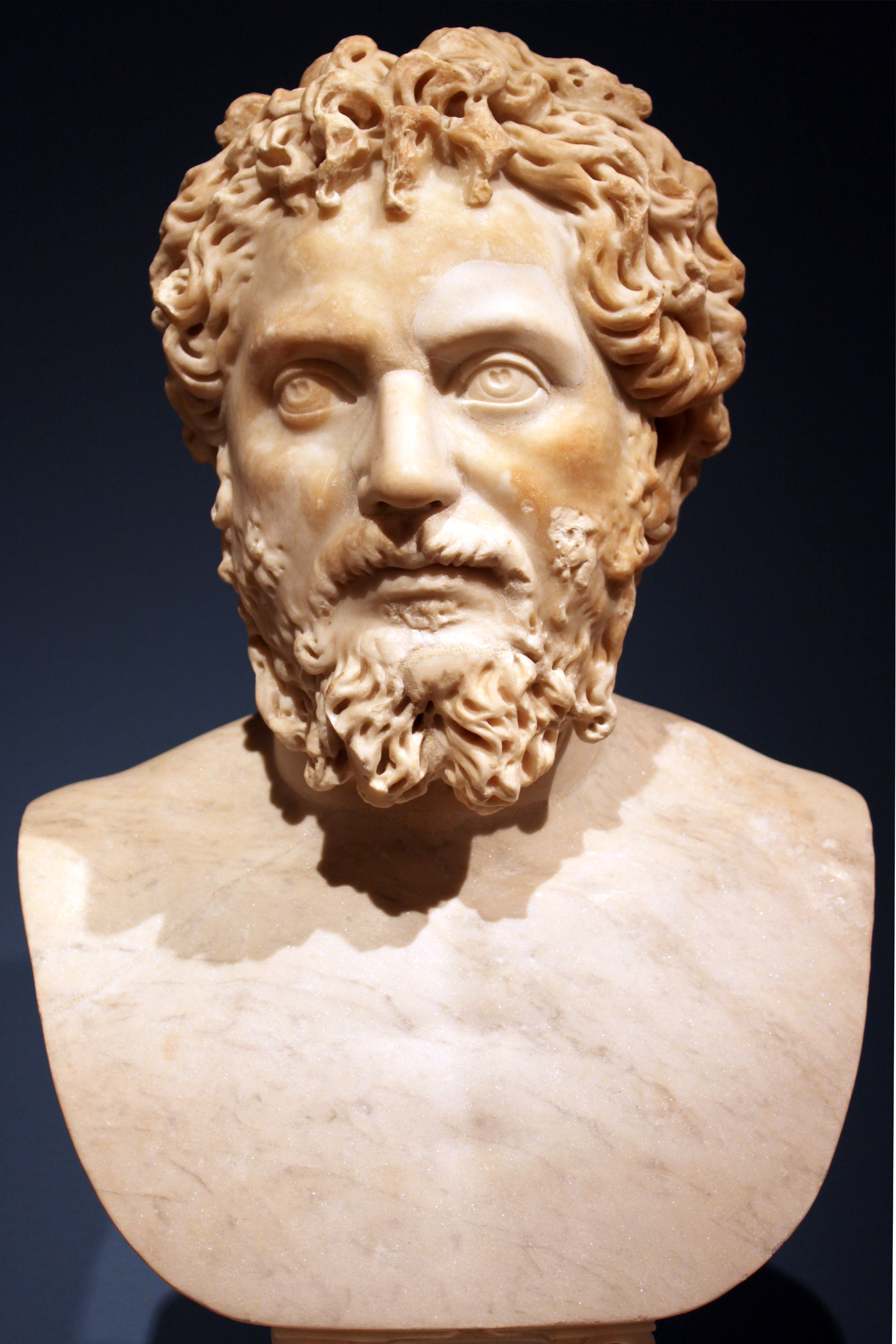
Roman marble bust of Septimius Severus, early 3rd century AD, Altes Museum

In 191, on the advice of Quintus Aemilius Laetus, prefect of the Praetorian Guard, emperor Commodus appointed Severus as governor of Pannonia Superior. At around this time he is described by the classicist Kyle Harper as being "a middling senator of modest physical stature and unexceptional accomplishment". Commodus was assassinated the following year. Pertinax was acclaimed emperor, but he was then killed by the Praetorian Guard in early 193. In response to the murder of Pertinax, Severus's legion XIV Gemina acclaimed him emperor at Carnuntum on 9 April. Nearby legions, such as X Gemina at Vindobona, soon followed suit. Having assembled an army, Severus hurried to Italy.

Pertinax's successor in Rome, Didius Julianus, had bought the emperorship in an auction. Julianus was condemned to death by the Senate and killed. Severus took possession of Rome without opposition. He executed Pertinax's murderers and dismissed the rest of the Praetorian Guard, filling its ranks with loyal troops from his own legions.

The legions of Syria had proclaimed Pescennius Niger emperor. At the same time Severus felt it reasonable to offer Clodius Albinus, the powerful governor of Britannia, who had probably supported Didius against him, the rank of Caesar, which implied some claim to the succession. With his rear safe, he moved to the East and crushed Niger's forces at the Battle of Issus (194). While campaigning against Byzantium, he ordered that the tomb of his fellow-Carthaginian Hannibal be covered with fine marble.

He devoted the following year to suppressing Mesopotamia and other Parthian vassals who had backed Niger. Afterwards, Severus declared his son Caracalla as his successor, which caused Albinus to be hailed emperor by his troops and to invade Gaul. After a short stay in Rome, Severus moved north to meet him. On 19 February 197 at the Battle of Lugdunum, with an army of about 75,000 men, mostly composed of Pannonian, Moesian and Dacian legions and a large number of auxiliaries, Severus defeated and killed Clodius Albinus, securing his full control over the empire. Upon returning to Rome, Severus had 29 senators executed for treason over their support of Albinus, despite having previously taken an oath promising not to put any senators to death (a customary oath for emperors).

== Emperor ==
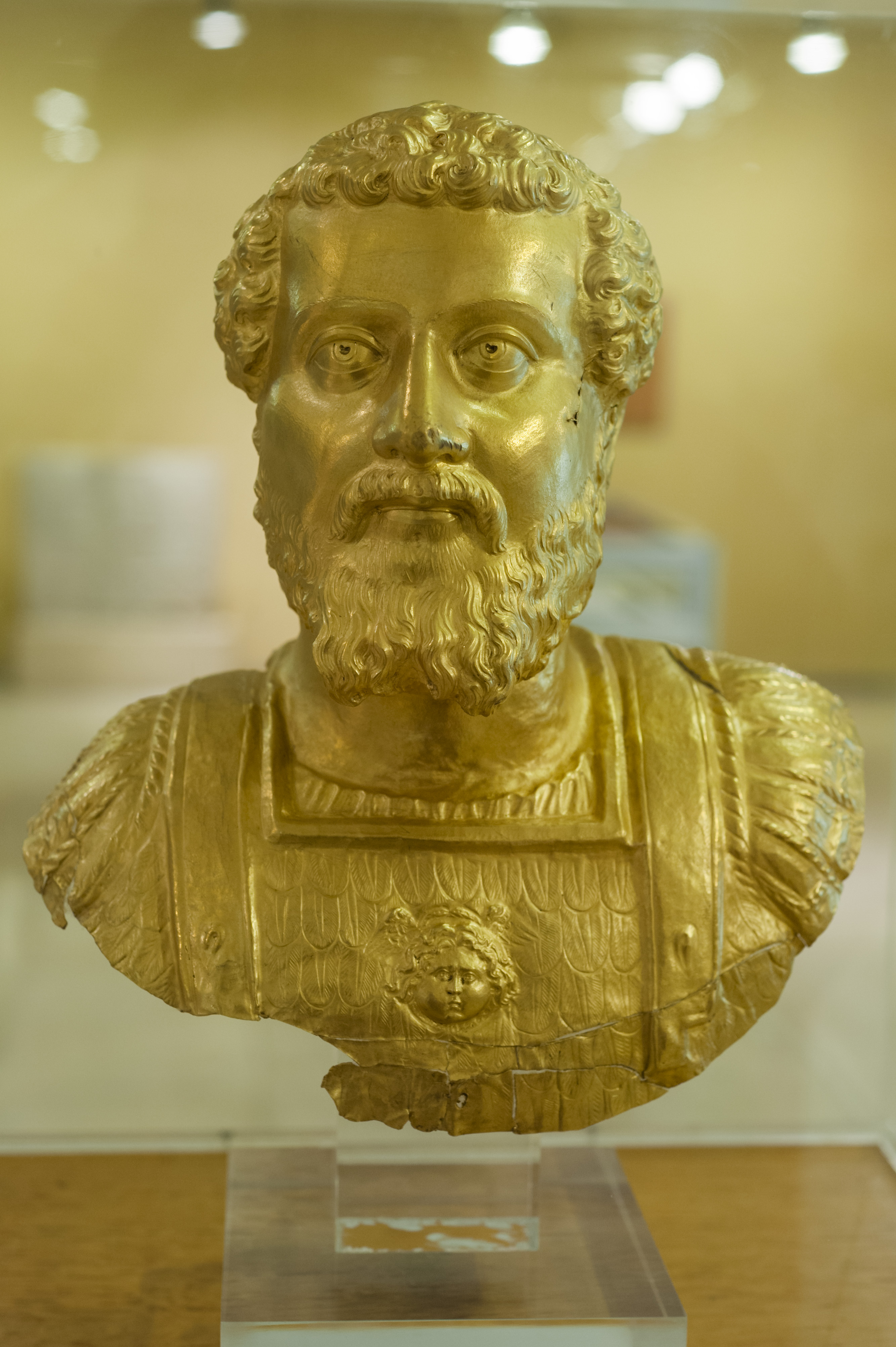
Golden Bust of Septimius Severus found in 1965 at Didymoteicho in Northern Greece, now at the Archaeological Museum of Komotini

=== War against Parthia ===
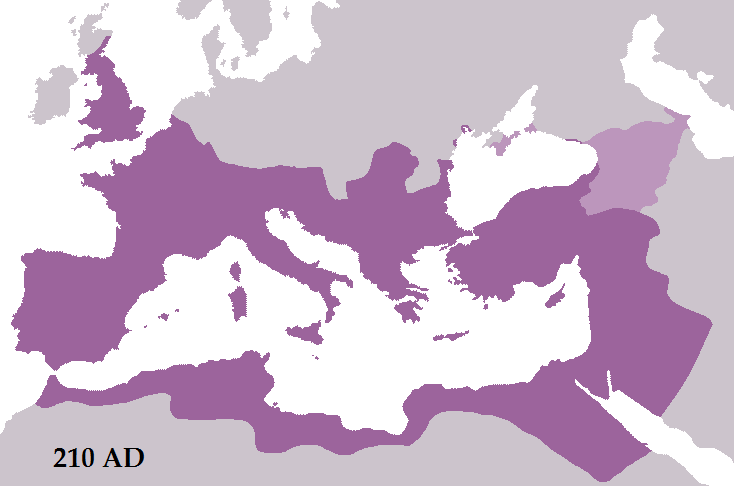
The Roman Empire in 210 after the conquests of Severus, showing Roman territory (purple) and Roman dependencies (light purple)

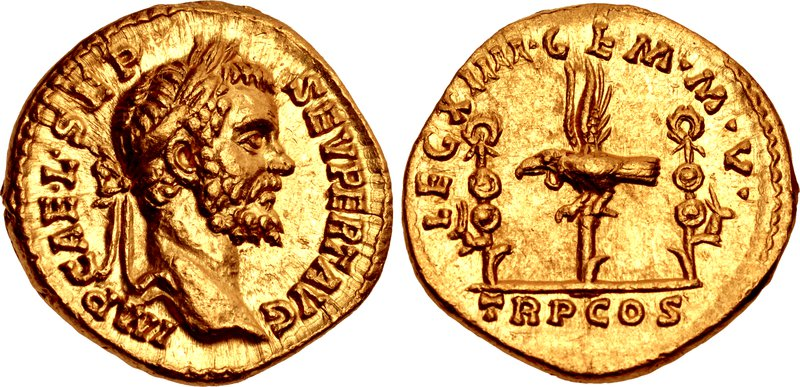
Aureus minted in 193 by Severus to celebrate Legio XIV Gemina Martia Victrix, the legion that proclaimed him emperor. Inscription: IMP. CAE. L. SEP. SEV. PERT[INAX] AVG. / LEG. XIIII CEM. M. V. – TR. P., CO[N]S.

In early 197, Severus left Rome and sailed to the east. He embarked at Brundisium and probably landed at the port of Aegeae in Cilicia, travelling on to Syria by land. He immediately gathered his army and crossed the Euphrates. Abgar IX, titular King of Osroene but essentially only the ruler of Edessa since the annexation of his kingdom as a Roman province, handed over his children as hostages and assisted Severus's expedition by providing archers. King Khosrov I of Armenia also sent hostages, money and gifts.

Severus travelled on to Nisibis, which his general Julius Laetus had prevented from falling into Parthian hands. Afterwards Severus returned to Syria to plan a more ambitious campaign. The following year he led another, more successful campaign against the Parthian Empire, reportedly in retaliation for the support it had given to Pescennius Niger. His legions sacked the Parthian royal city of Ctesiphon and he annexed the northern half of Mesopotamia to the empire; Severus took the title Parthicus Maximus, following the example of Trajan. However, he was unable to capture the fortress of Hatra, even after two lengthy sieges—just like Trajan, who had tried nearly a century before. During his time in the east, though, Severus also expanded the Limes Arabicus, building new fortifications in the Arabian Desert from Basie to Dumatha.

=== Relations with the Senate and People ===
Severus's relations with the Senate was never good. He was unpopular with them from the outset, having seized power with the help of the military, and he returned the sentiment. Severus ordered the execution of a large number of Senators on charges of corruption or conspiracy against him and replaced them with his favorites. Although his actions turned Rome more into a military monarchy, he was popular with the citizens of Rome, having stamped out the rampant corruption of Commodus' reign. When he returned from his victory over the Parthians, he erected the Arch of Septimius Severus in Rome.

According to Cassius Dio, however, after 197 Severus fell heavily under the influence of his Praetorian prefect, Gaius Fulvius Plautianus, who came to have almost total control of the imperial administration. At the same time, a bloody power crisis erupted between Plautianus and Julia Domna, Severus's influential and powerful wife, which had a relatively destructive effect on the centre of power. Plautianus' daughter Fulvia Plautilla was married to Severus's son Caracalla. Plautianus' excessive power came to an end in 204, when he was denounced by the emperor's dying brother. In January 205 Julia Domna and Caracalla accused Plautianus of plotting to kill him and Severus. The powerful prefect was executed while he was trying to defend his case in front of the two emperors. One of the two following praefecti was the famous jurist Papinian. Executions of senators did not stop: Cassius Dio records that many of them were put to death, some after being formally tried. After the assassination of Gaius Fulvius Plautianus, for the rest of his reign he relied more on the advice of his clever and educated wife, Julia Domna, in the administration of the empire.

=== Military reforms ===
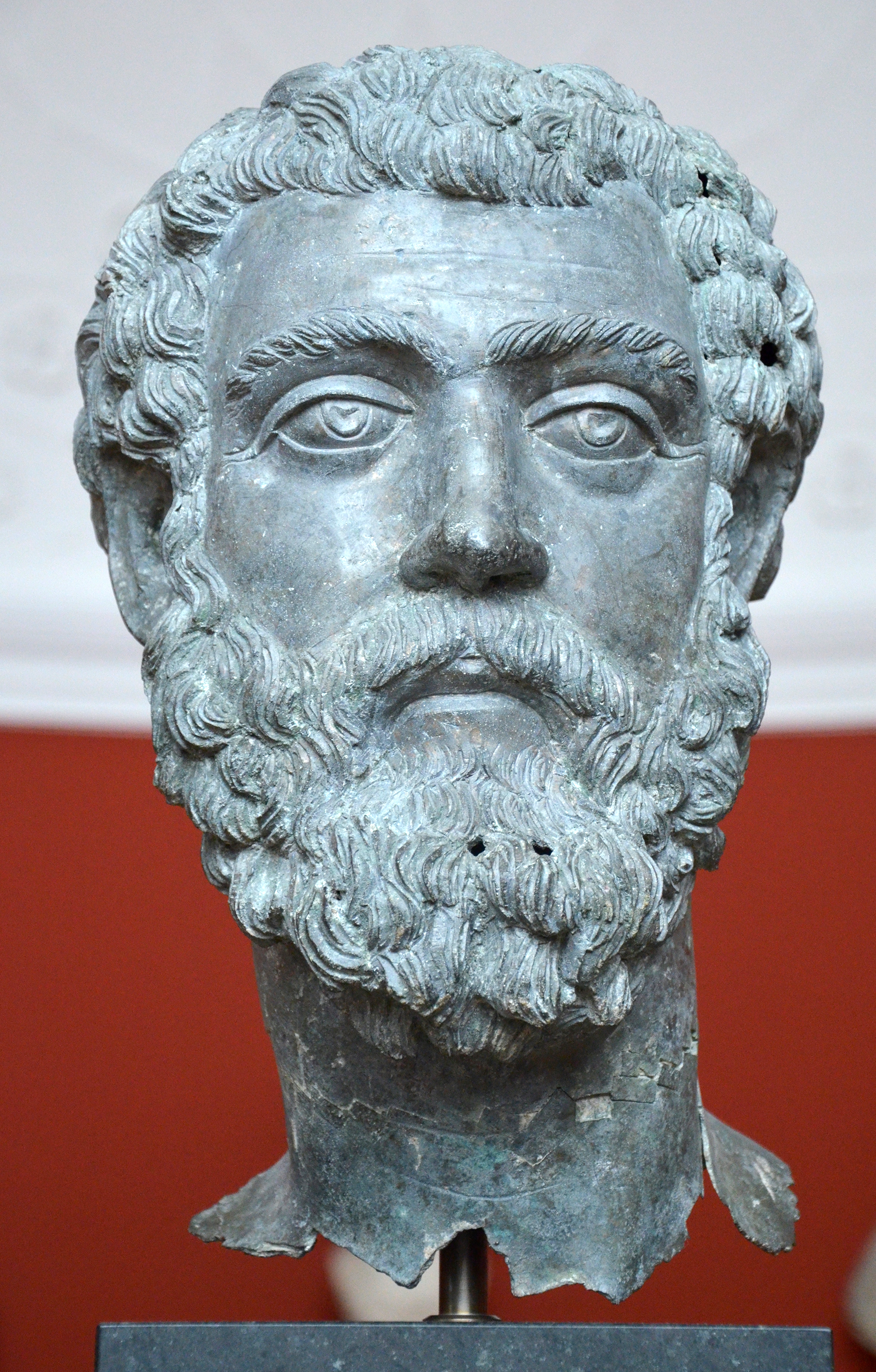
Bronze head of Septimius Severus, from Asia Minor, c. 195–211 AD, Ny Carlsberg Glyptotek, Copenhagen. Inscription: IMP. CAE. L. SEP. SEV. PERT. AVG. / LEG. XIIII, CEM M V – TRP COS.

Upon his arrival at Rome in 193, Severus discharged the Praetorian Guard, which had murdered Pertinax and had then auctioned the Roman Empire to Didius Julianus. Its members were stripped of their ceremonial armour and forbidden to come within 160 kilometres (99 mi) of the city on pain of death. Severus replaced the old guard with 10 new cohorts recruited from veterans of his Danubian legions.

Around 197 he increased the number of legions from 30 to 33, with the introduction of the three new legions: I, II and III Parthica. He garrisoned Legio II Parthica at Albanum, only 20 kilometres (12 mi) from Rome. He gave his soldiers a donative of a thousand sesterces (250 denarii) each, and raised the annual wage for a soldier in the legions from 300 to 400 denarii.

Severus was the first Roman emperor to station some of the imperial army in Italy. He realized that Rome needed a military central reserve with the capability to be sent anywhere.

=== Persecution of Christians ===
At the beginning of Severus's reign, Trajan's policy toward the Christians was still in force. That is, Christians were only to be punished if they refused to worship the emperor and the gods, but they were not to be sought out. Therefore, persecution was inconsistent, local and sporadic. Faced with internal dissidence and external threats, Severus felt the need to promote religious harmony by promoting syncretism. He possibly issued an edict that punished conversion to Judaism and Christianity.

A number of persecutions of Christians occurred in the Roman Empire during his reign and were traditionally attributed to Severus by the early Christian community. A decree by Severus against the Christians is mentioned in the Historia Augusta, an unreliable mix of fact and fiction. Early church historian Eusebius described Severus as a persecutor. However, the Christian apologist Tertullian stated that Severus was well disposed towards Christians, employed a Christian as his personal physician and had personally intervened to save several high-born Christians known to him from the mob. Some scholars think that Eusebius' description of Severus as a persecutor likely derives merely from the fact that numerous persecutions occurred during his reign, including those known in the Roman Martyrology as the martyrs of Madauros, Charalambos and Perpetua and Felicity in Roman-ruled Africa. These were probably the result of local persecutions rather than empire-wide actions or decrees by Severus.

=== Military activity in Africa ===
In late 202 Severus launched a campaign in the province of Africa. The legatus legionis or commander of Legio III Augusta, Quintus Anicius Faustus, had been fighting against the Garamantes along the Limes Tripolitanus for five years. He captured several settlements such as Cydamus, Gholaia, Garbia and their capital Garama—over 600 kilometres (370 mi) south of Leptis Magna. The province of Numidia was also enlarged: the empire annexed the settlements of Vescera, Castellum Dimmidi, Gemellae, Thabudeos and Thubunae. By 203 the entire southern frontier of Roman Africa had been dramatically expanded and re-fortified. Desert nomads could no longer safely raid the region's interior and escape back into the Sahara.

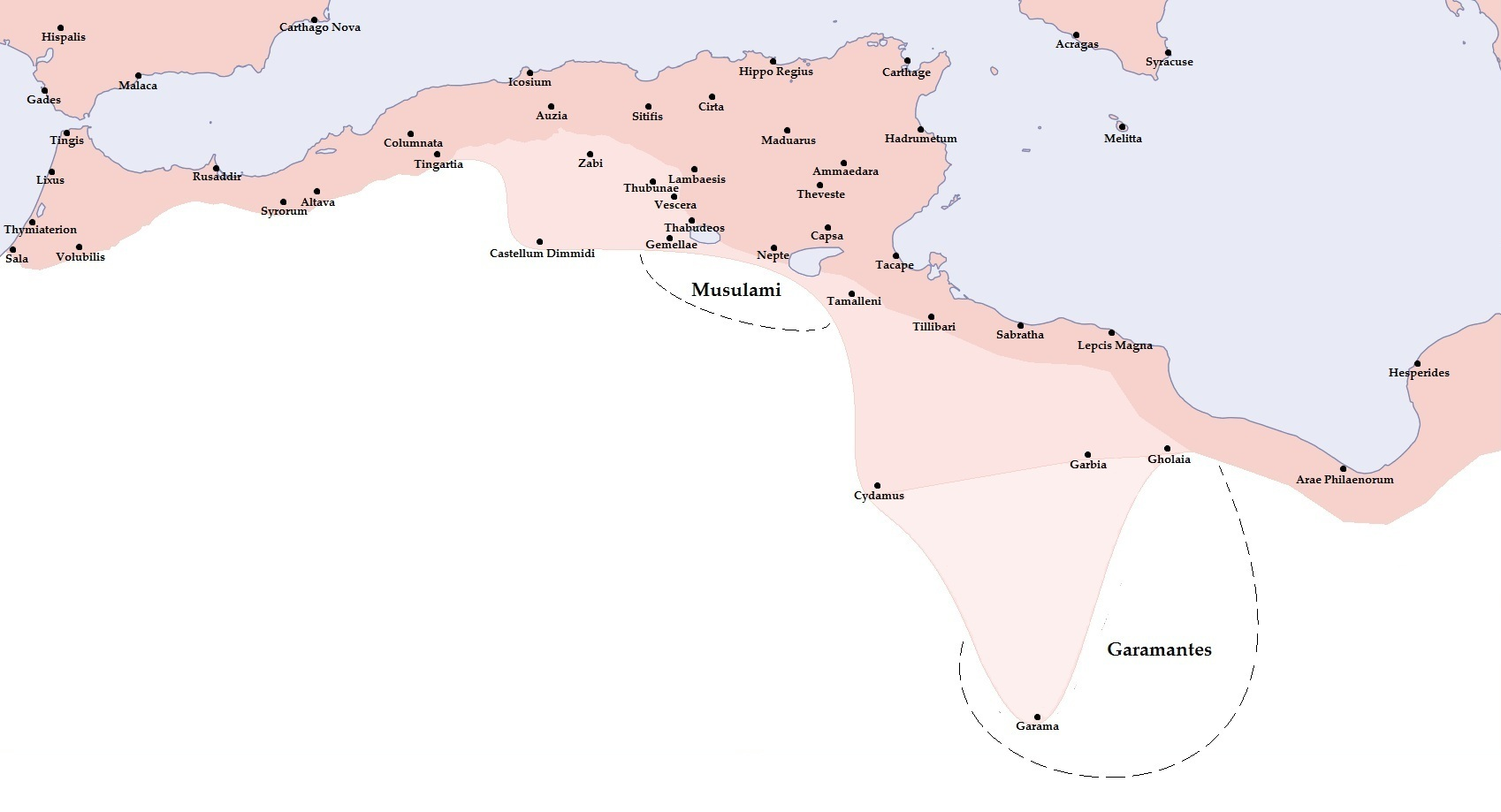
The expansion of the African frontier during the reign of Severus (medium tan). Severus even briefly held a military presence in Garama in 203 (light tan).

=== Britain ===
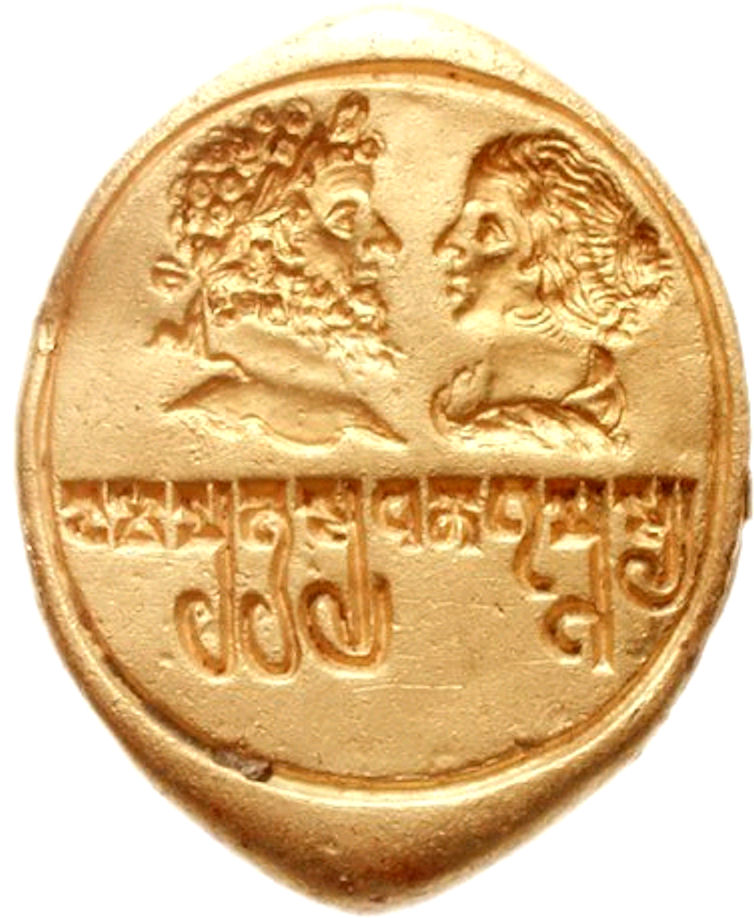
Kushan ring with portraits of Septimius Severus and Julia Domna, a testimony to Indo-Roman relations of the period

In 208, Severus travelled to Britain with the intention of conquering Caledonia. Modern archaeological discoveries illuminate the scope and direction of his northern campaign. Severus probably arrived in Britain with an army of more than 40,000, considering some of the camps constructed during his campaign could house this number.

He strengthened Hadrian's Wall and reconquered the Southern Uplands up to the Antonine Wall, which was also enhanced. Supported and supplied by a strong naval force, Severus then thrust north with his army across the wall into Caledonian territory. Retracing the steps of Agricola of more than a century earlier, Severus rebuilt and garrisoned many abandoned Roman forts along the east coast, such as Carpow.

Cassius Dio's account of the invasion reads:

Severus, accordingly, desiring to subjugate the whole of it, invaded Caledonia. But as he advanced through the country he experienced countless hardships in cutting down the forests, levelling the heights, filling up the swamps, and bridging the rivers; but he fought no battle and beheld no enemy in battle array. The enemy purposely put sheep and cattle in front of the soldiers for them to seize, in order that they might be lured on still further until they were worn out; for in fact, the water caused great suffering to the Romans, and when they became scattered, they would be attacked. Then, unable to walk, they would be slain by their own men, in order to avoid capture, so that a full fifty thousand died. But Severus did not desist until he approached the extremity of the island. Here he observed most accurately the variation of the sun's motion and the length of the days and the nights in summer and winter, respectively. Having thus been conveyed through practically the whole of the hostile country (for he actually was conveyed in a covered litter most of the way, on account of his infirmity), he returned to the friendly portion, after he had forced the Britons to come to terms, on the condition that they should abandon a large part of their territory.

By 210, Severus's campaigning had made significant gains, despite Caledonian guerrilla tactics and purportedly heavy Roman casualties. The Caledonians sued for peace, which Severus granted on condition they relinquish control of the Central Lowlands (of what is now Scotland) as evidenced by the extensive Severan-era fortifications there. The Caledonians, short on supplies and feeling that their position was desperate, revolted later that year with the Maeatae. Severus prepared for another protracted campaign within Caledonia. He was now intent on exterminating the Caledonians, telling his soldiers: "Let no-one escape sheer destruction, no-one our hands, not even the babe in the womb of the mother, if it be male; let it nevertheless not escape sheer destruction."

== Death ==
Severus's campaign was cut short when he fell ill. He withdrew to Eboracum (modern York, England) and died there in 211. Although his son Caracalla continued campaigning the following year, he soon settled for peace. The Romans never campaigned deep into Caledonia again. Shortly after this, the frontier was permanently withdrawn south to Hadrian's Wall. Severus was cremated in York and his ashes were interred at the Castel Sant'Angelo. Cassius Dio describes his funeral in Book 77 of his Roman History:

"After this his body, arrayed in military garb, was placed upon a pyre, and as a mark of honour the soldiers and his sons ran about it; and as for the soldiers' gifts, those who had things at hand to offer as gifts threw them upon it, and his sons applied the fire. Afterwards his bones were put in an urn of purple stone, carried to Rome, and deposited in the tomb of the Antonines. It is said that Severus sent for the urn shortly before his death, and after feeling of it, remarked: "Thou shalt hold a man that the world could not hold."

Dio does not describe the location of Severus's cremation, but antiquarians such as Francis Drake pinpoint a location to Severus Hill in Holgate. The only evidence of Romans on the hill is a Roman road; no other archaeological investigations have corroborated these claims.

Severus is famously said to have given the advice to his sons: "Be harmonious, enrich the soldiers, scorn all others" before he died on 4 February 211. On his death, Severus was deified by the Senate and succeeded by his sons, Caracalla and Geta, who were advised by his wife Julia Domna. Severus was buried in the Mausoleum of Hadrian in Rome.

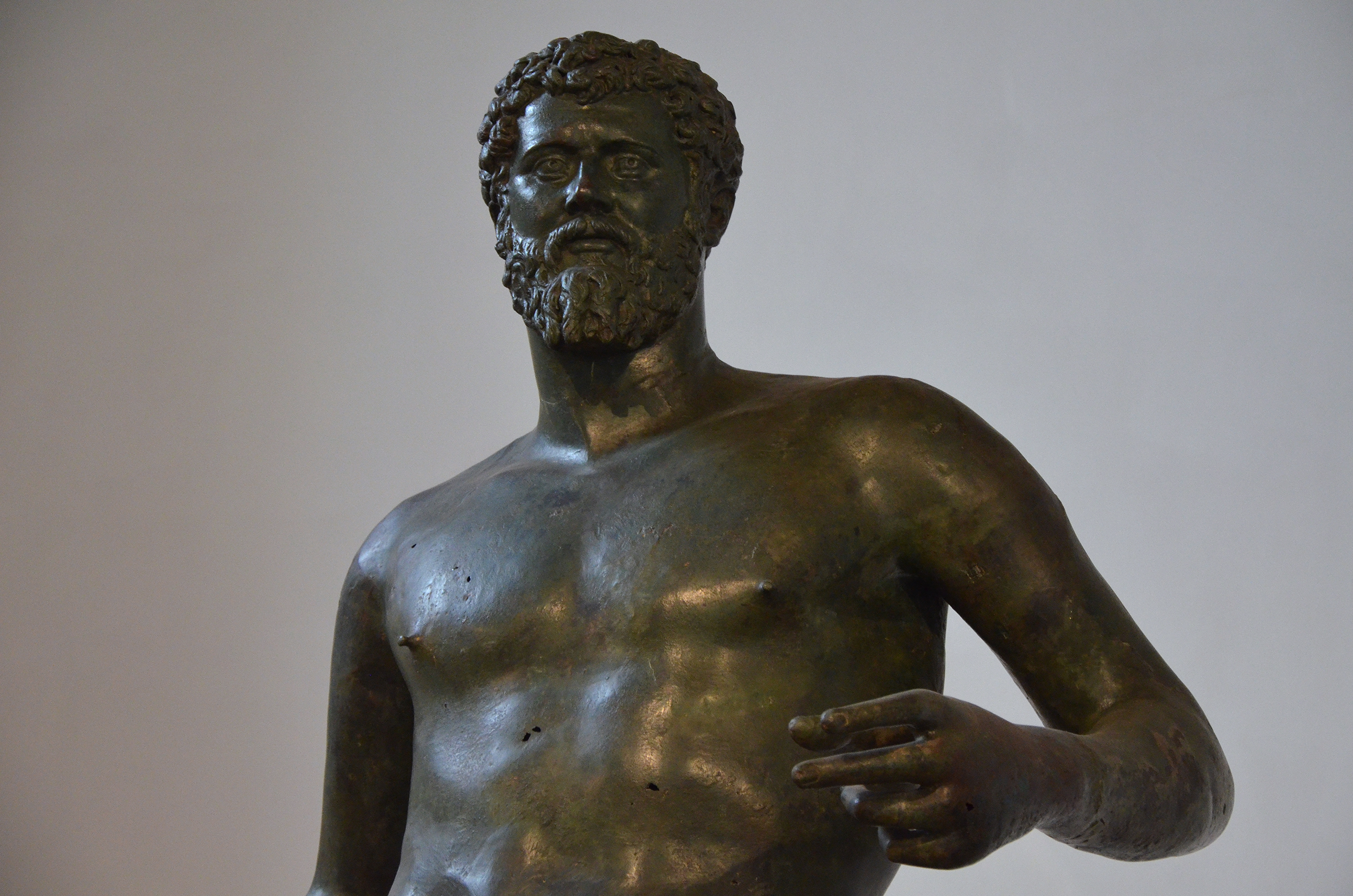
Large bronze statue of Septimius Severus depicted in heroic nudity, Cyprus Museum

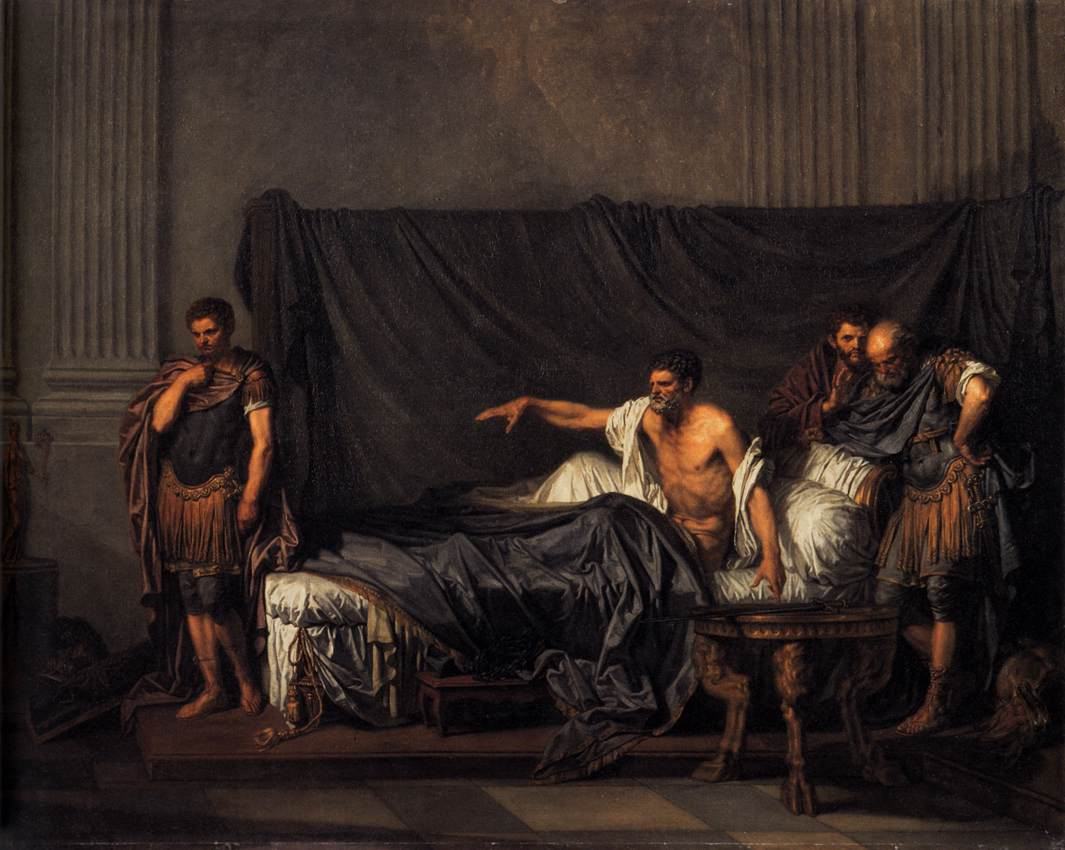
Septimius Severus on his deathbed next to his son Caracalla. Septimius Severus and Caracalla by Jean-Baptiste Greuze (c. 1769).

== Assessment and legacy ==
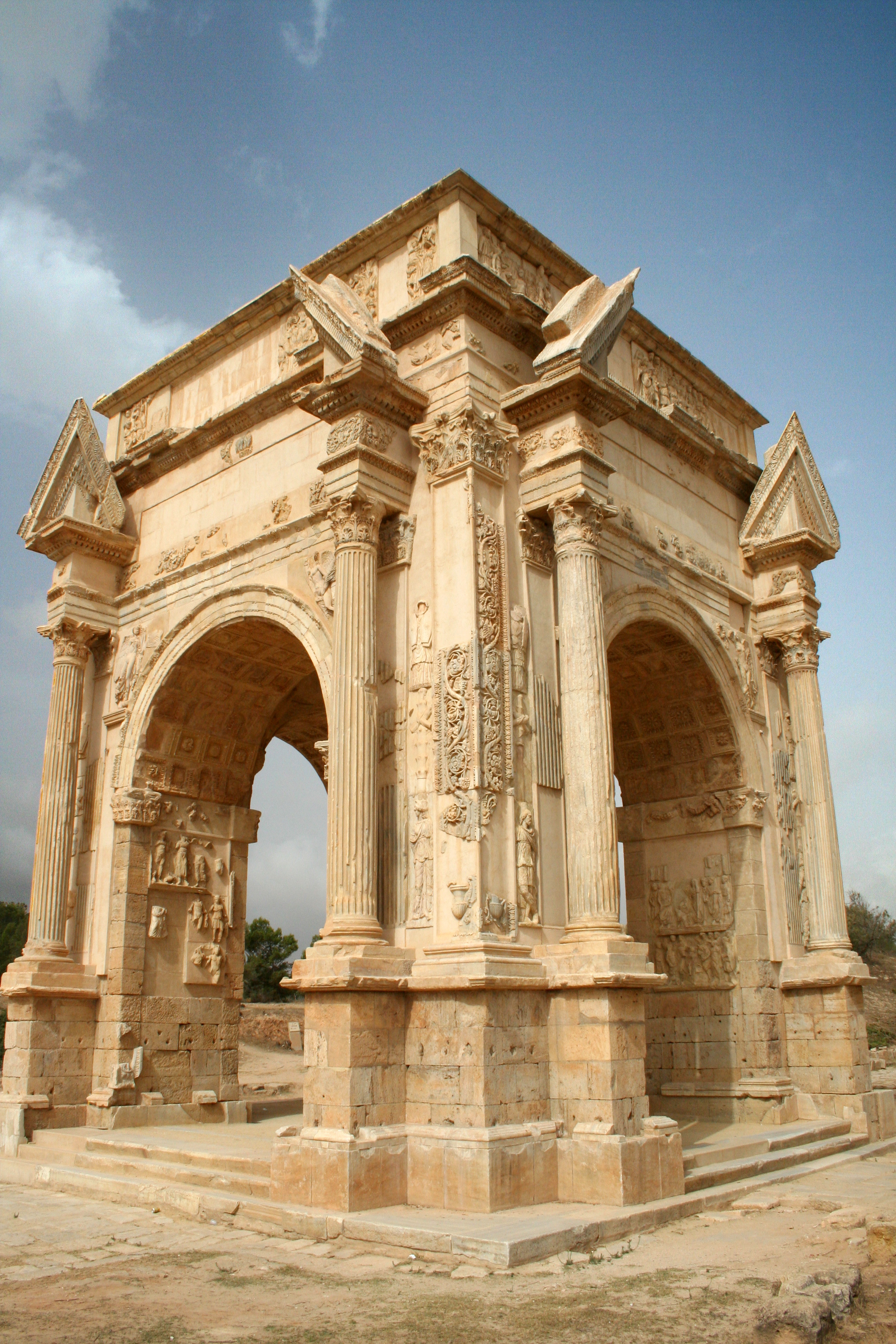
The Arch of Septimius Severus at Leptis Magna

By the close of his reign, the Roman Empire reached an extent of its territorial control of over 5 million square kilometres, which scholars such as David L. Kennedy, Lukas De Blois, and Derrick Riley assert expanded the empire to its greatest extent.

Edward Gibbon famously levelled a harsh indictment of Septimius Severus as a principal agent in the empire's decline. "The contemporaries of Severus, in the enjoyment of the peace and glory of his reign, forgave the cruelties by which it had been introduced. Posterity, who experienced the fatal effects of his maxims and example, justly considered him as the principal author of the decline of the Roman empire." According to Gibbon, "his daring ambition [...] was never diverted from its steady course by the allurements of pleasure, the apprehension of danger, or the feelings of humanity." His enlargement of the Limes Tripolitanus secured Africa, the agricultural base of the empire where he was born. His victory over the Parthian Empire was for a time decisive, securing Nisibis and Singara for the empire and establishing a status quo of Roman dominance in the region until 251. His policy of an expanded and better-rewarded army was criticised by his contemporaries Cassius Dio and Herodianus: in particular, they pointed out the increasing burden, in the form of taxes and services, the civilian population had to bear to maintain the new and better-paid army. The large and ongoing increase in military expenditure caused problems for all of his successors.

To maintain his enlarged military, he debased the Roman currency. Upon his accession he decreased the silver purity of the denarius from 81.5% to 78.5%, although the silver weight actually increased, rising from 2.40 grams to 2.46 grams. Nevertheless, the following year he debased the denarius again because of rising military expenditures. The silver purity decreased from 78.5% to 64.5%—the silver weight dropping from 2.46 grams to 1.98 grams. In 196 he reduced the purity and silver weight of the denarius again, to 54% and 1.82 grams, respectively. Severus's currency debasement was the largest since the reign of Nero, compromising the long-term strength of the economy.

Severus was also distinguished for his buildings. Apart from the triumphal arch in the Roman Forum carrying his full name, he also built the Septizodium in Rome. He enriched his native city of Leptis Magna, including commissioning a triumphal arch on the occasion of his visit of 203.

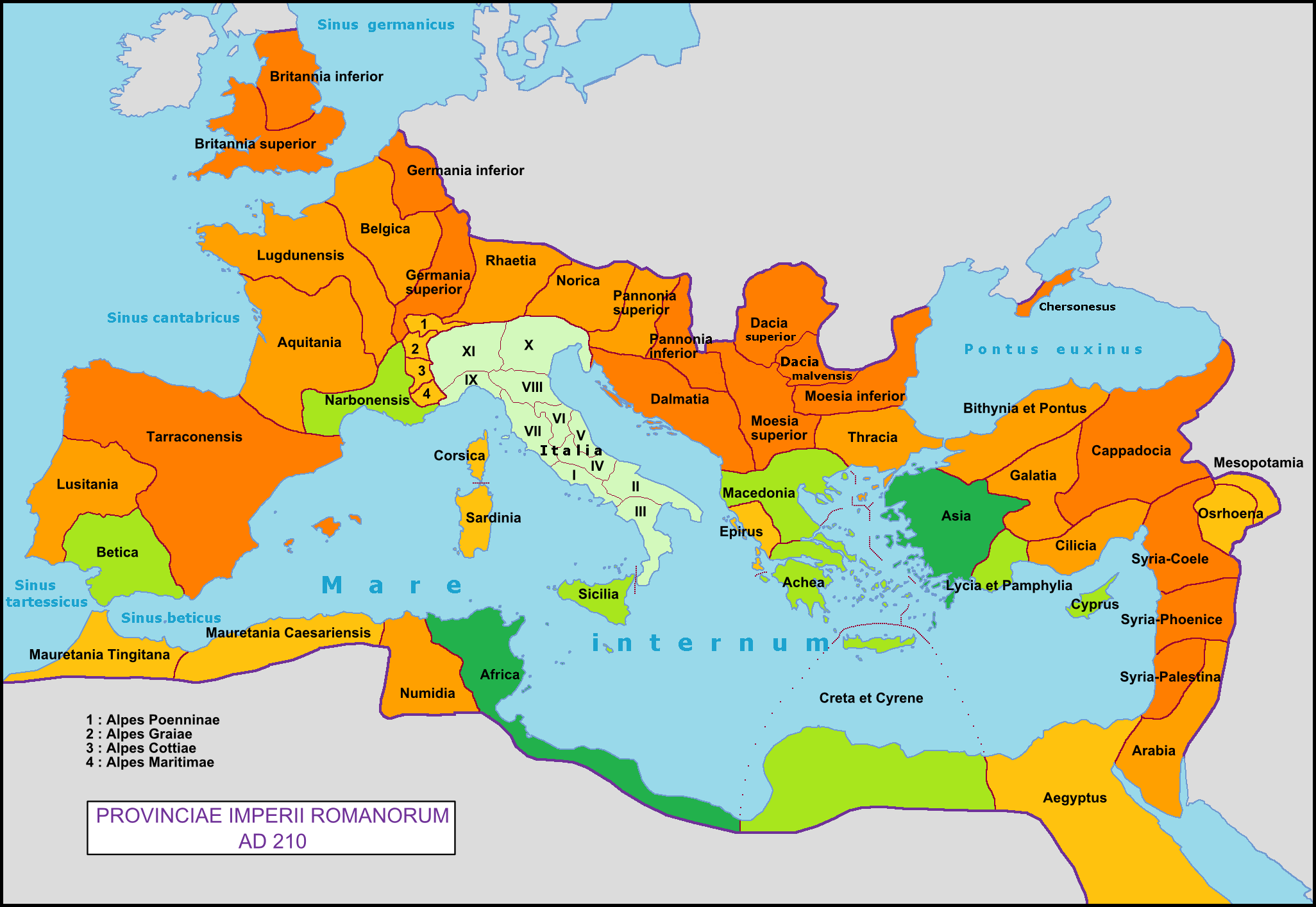
The Provinces of the Roman Empire in 210 AD

== Severan dynasty family tree ==
Severan family tree

Septimius Macer
Gaius Claudius Septimius Aper	Fulvius Pius	Lucius Septimius Severus
Publius Septimius Aper	Gaius Septimius Aper	Fulvia Pia	Publius Septimius Geta	Septimia Polla	Julius Bassianus
Septimius	Publius Septimius Geta	Septimia Octavilla	Paccia Marciana (1)	Septimius Severus (r. 193–211)	Julia Domna (2)	Julia Maesa	Gaius Julius Avitus Alexianus
Gaius Septimius Severus Aper	Fulvia Plautilla	Caracalla (r. 197–217)	Geta (r. 209–211)	Julia Soaemias	Sextus Varius Marcellus	Julia Avita Mamaea	Unknown (2)
Julia Cornelia Paula (1)	Aquilia Severa (2 and 4)	Elagabalus (r. 218–222)	Annia Faustina (3)	Sallustia Orbiana	Severus Alexander (r. 222–235)

- (1) = 1st spouse
- (2) = 2nd spouse
- (3) = 3rd spouse
- (4) = 4th spouse
- Dark green indicates an emperor of the Severan dynasty

Notes:

Except where otherwise noted, the notes below indicate that an individual's parentage is as shown in the above family tree.

Bibliography:

- Birley, Anthony R. (1999). Septimius Severus: The African Emperor. London: Routledge. ISBN 0415165911.
- Gibbon, Edward; Smith, William (1889). The Student's Gibbon: The Decline and Fall of the Roman Empire. London: Murray. OCLC 993285639.

== See also ==
- Arcus Argentariorum—dedicated by the money changers of Rome to the Severan family
- Bulla Felix
- Septimia gens

Septimius Severus Severan dynasty Born: 11 April 146 Died: 4 February 211
Regnal titles
Preceded by Didius Julianus	Roman Emperor; 193–211 with Pescennius Niger (rival 193–194), Clodius Albinus (rival 193–197), Caracalla (198–211), Publius Septimius Geta (209–211)	Succeeded by Caracalla, Publius Septimius Geta
Political offices
Preceded by Lucius Fabius Cilo, and Marcus Silius Messala	Consul of the Roman Empire; 194 with Clodius Albinus	Succeeded by Publius Julius Scapula Tertullus Priscus, and Quintus Tineius Clemens
Preceded by Annius Fabianus, and Marcus Nonius Arrius Mucianus	Consul of the Roman Empire; 202 with Caracalla	Succeeded by Titus Murrenius Severus, and Gaius Cassius Regallianus as Suffect consuls
