= 2nd century =

One hundred years, from 101 to 200

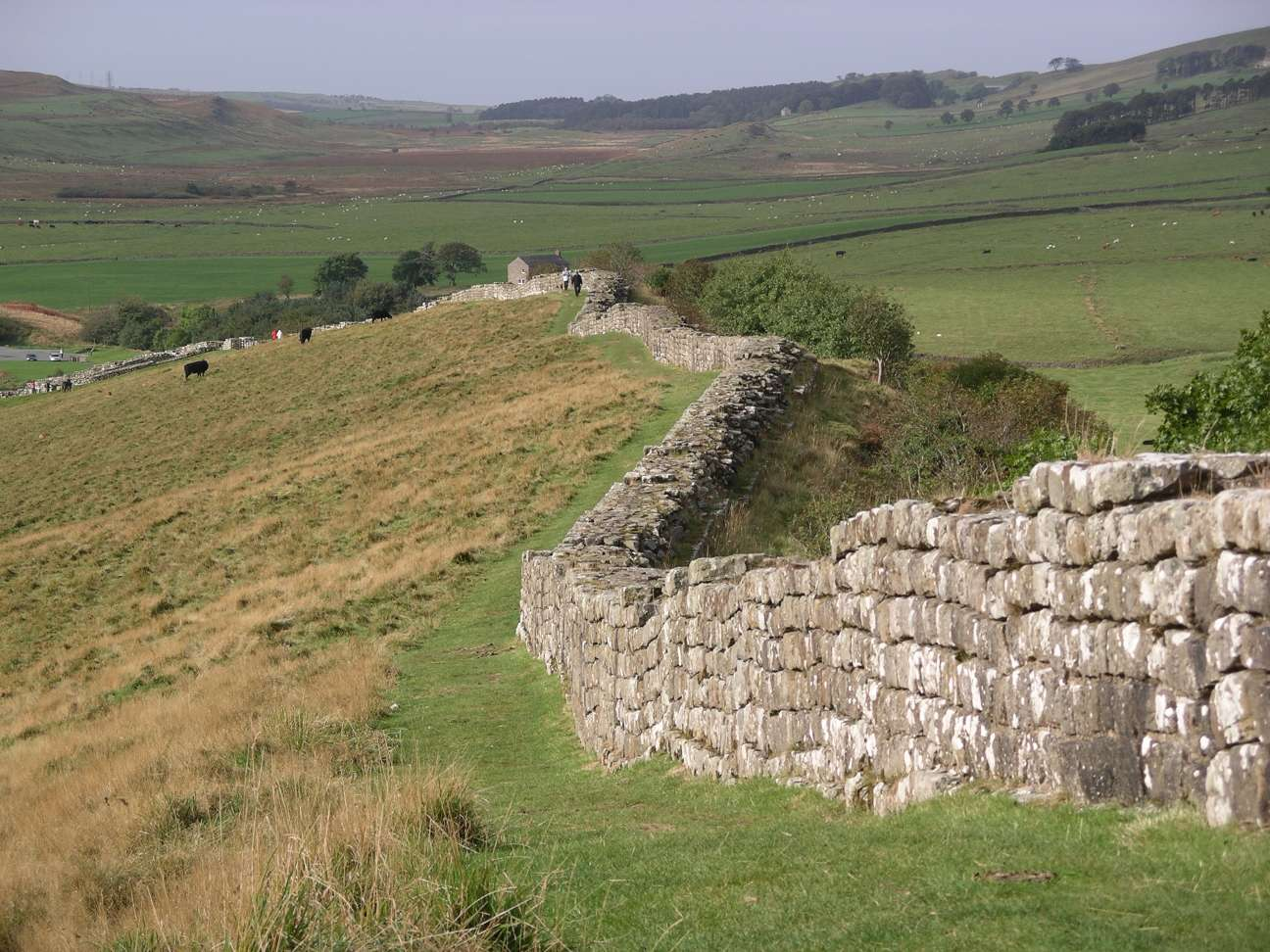
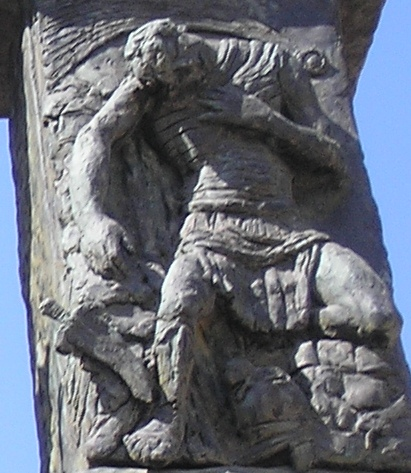
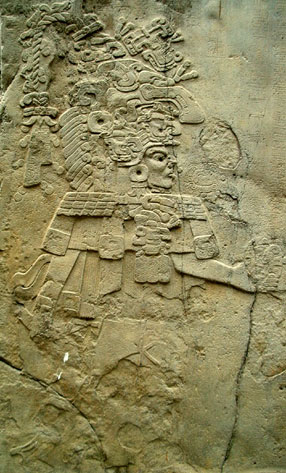
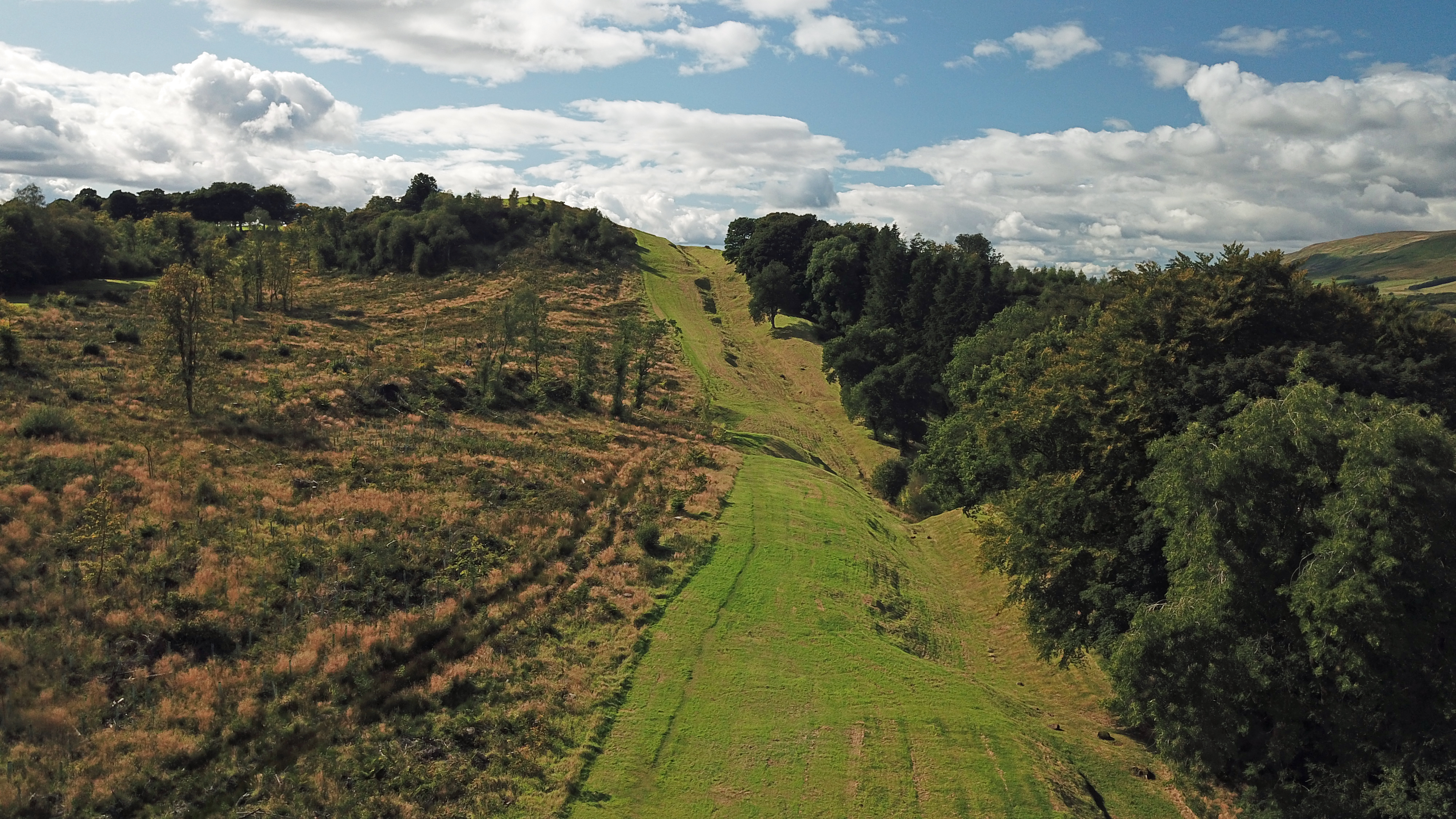
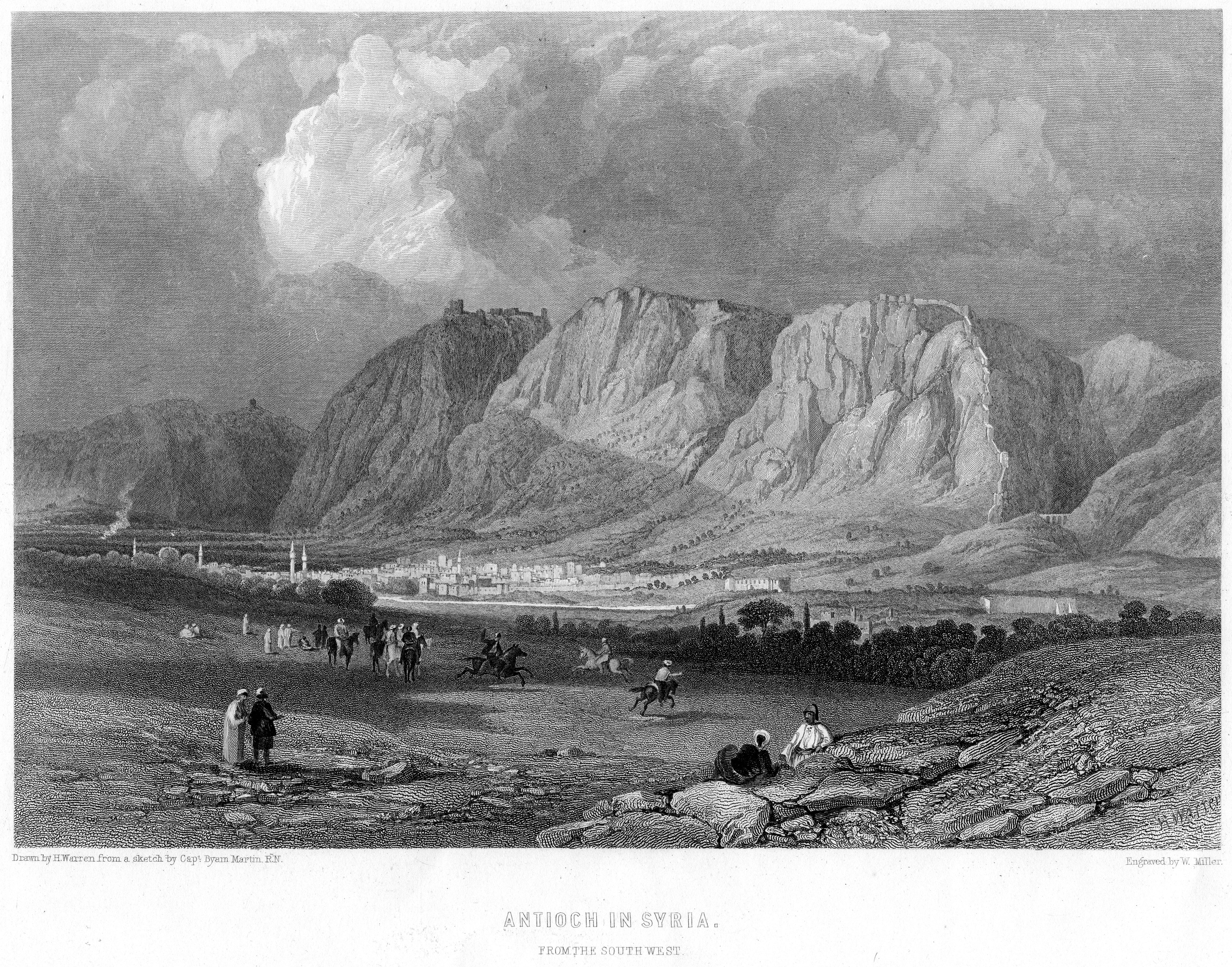
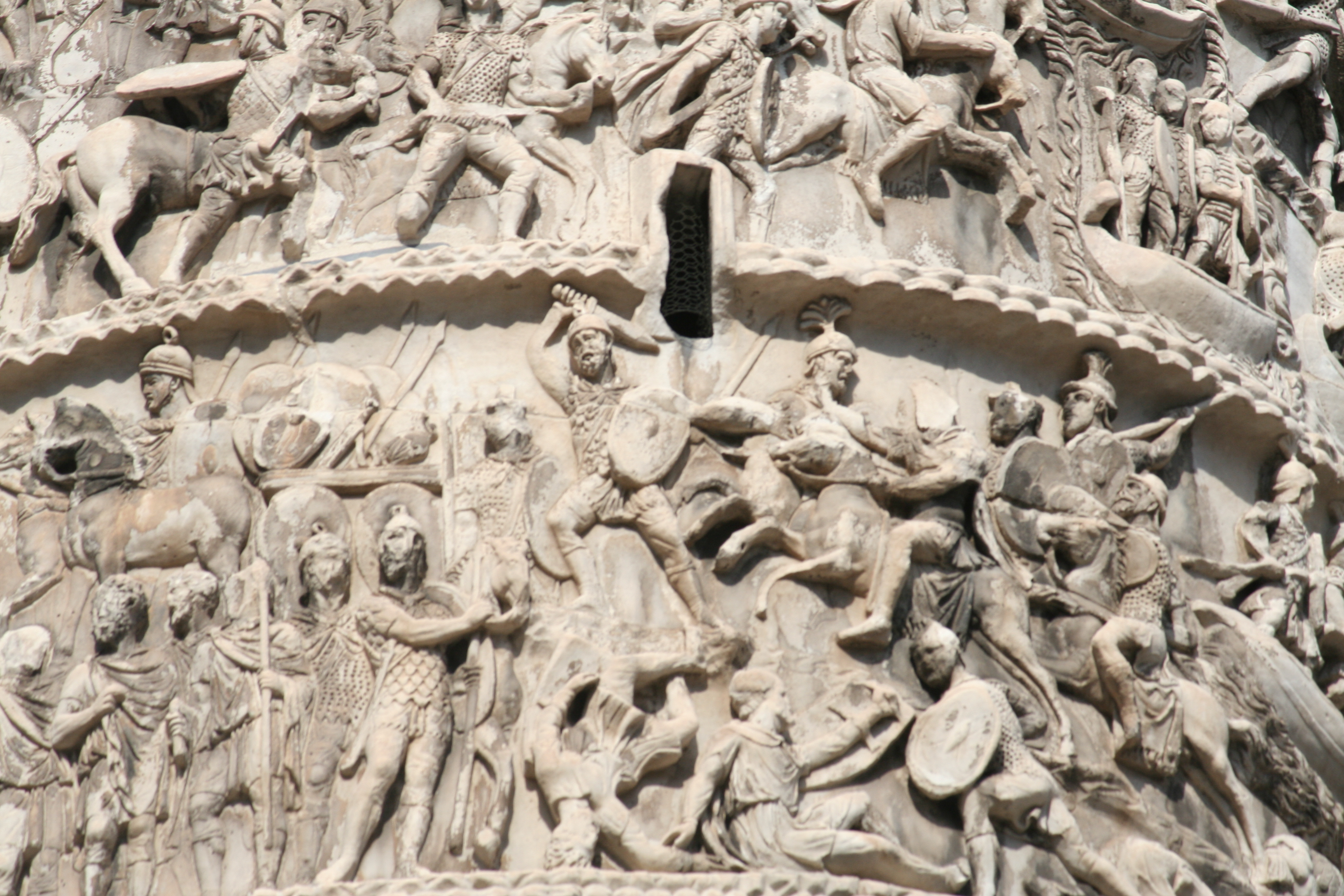
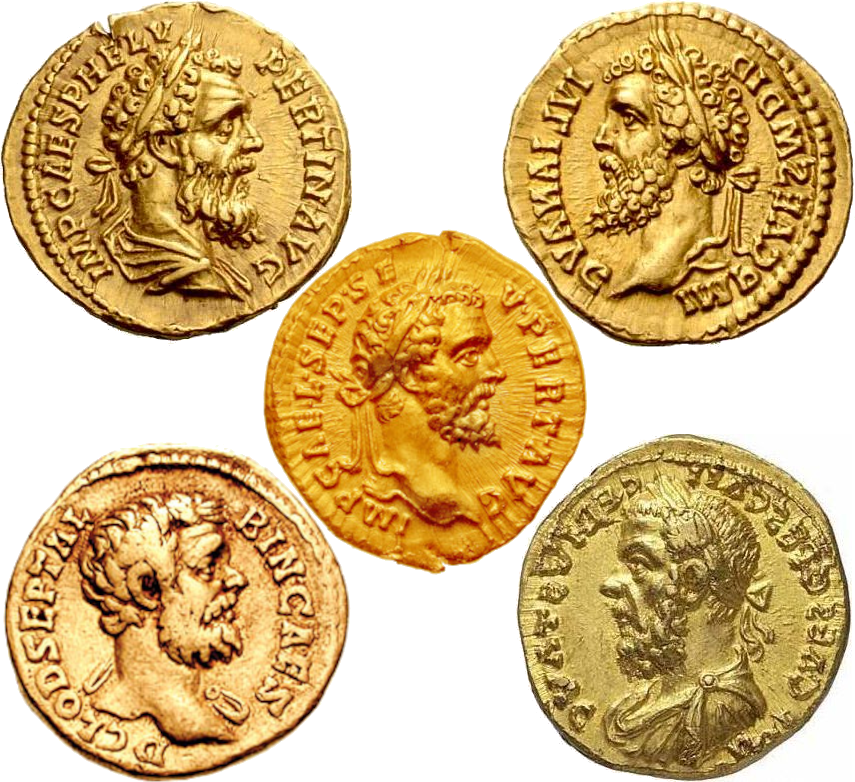
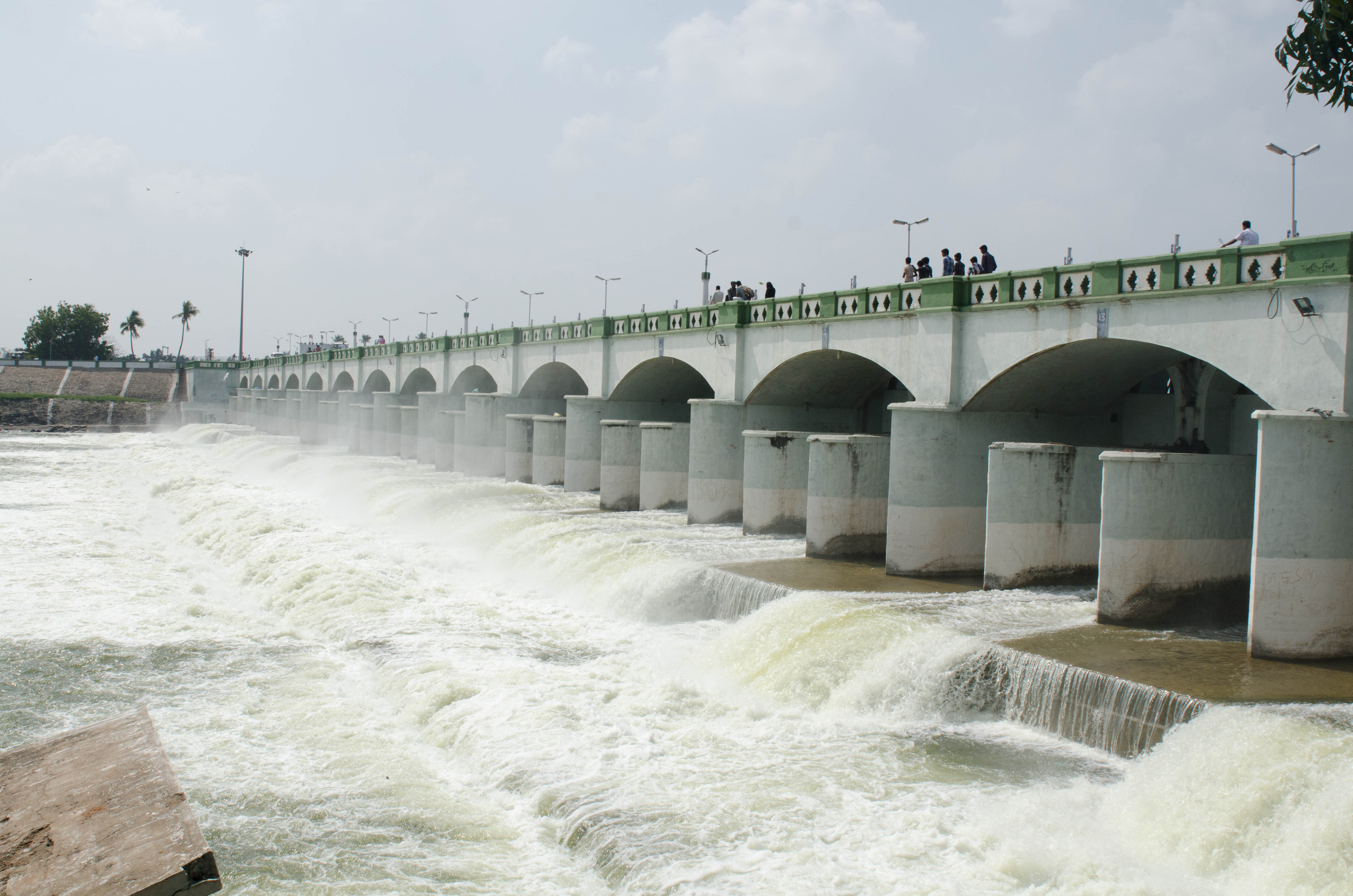

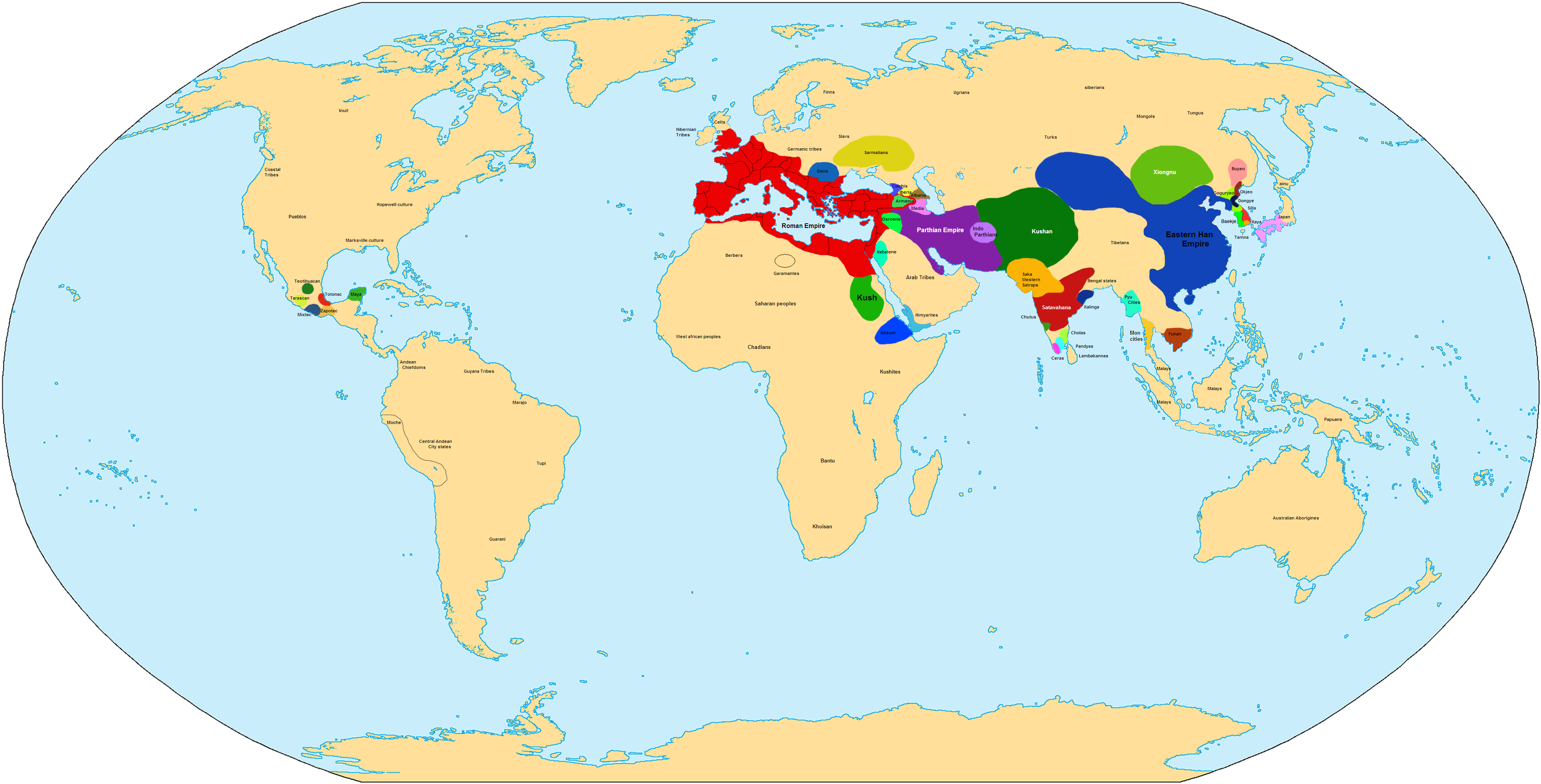
Map of the world in 100 AD.

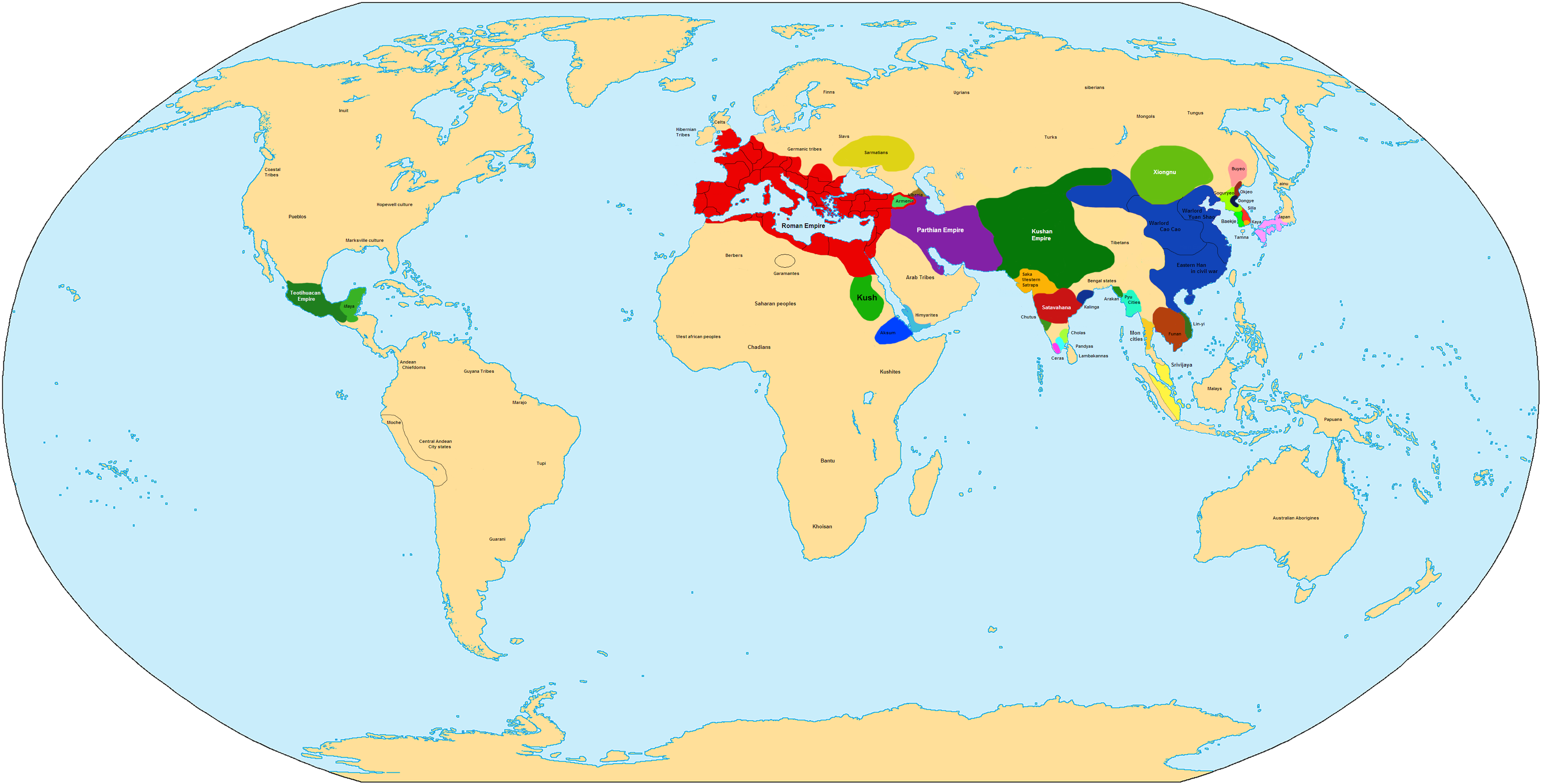
Map of the world in 200 AD, at the end of the second century.

The 2nd century is the period from AD 101 (represented by the Roman numerals CI) through AD 200 (CC) in accordance with the Julian calendar. It is considered part of the Classical era, epoch, or historical period.

Early in the century, the Roman Empire attained its greatest expansion under the emperor Trajan, but after his death became primarily defensive for the rest of its history. Much prosperity took place throughout the empire at this time, ruled as it was by the "Five Good Emperors", a succession of well-received and able rulers. This period also saw the removal of the Jews from Jerusalem during the reign of Hadrian after Bar Kokhba's revolt.

The last quarter of the century saw the end of the period of peace and prosperity known as the Pax Romana at the death of the emperor Marcus Aurelius, last of the "Five Good Emperors", and the ascension of Commodus. After Commodus was murdered in 192, a turbulent period known as the Year of the Five Emperors ensued. After the quick successive removals of Pertinax and Didius Julianus from power, this period had the general-turned-emperor Septimius Severus, who was the founder of the Severan dynasty, pitted against rival claimants in the form of Pescennius Niger. Severus' forces defeated the rival claimants at the Battle of Issus in 194, and Clodius Albinus, whom he defeated at the Battle of Lugdunum in 197, granting Severus sole authority over the empire.

Although the Han dynasty of China was firmly cemented into power and extended its imperial influence into Central Asia during the first half of the century, by the second half there was widespread corruption and open rebellion. This led to its decline, and in September 189, the Han general Dong Zhuo, after being summoned to the capital by He Jin to help quell the corrupt and powerful eunuch faction by serving as an intimidator to both them and the Empress Dowager, marched his army into Luoyang in light of He Jin's assassination and the subsequent slaughter of the eunuchs, taking over the capital and effectively becoming the de facto head of the government.

Warlords and government officials quickly took against him in a campaign that, while failing to put him down, compelled Dong Zhuo to shift the seat of imperial power further west to Chang'an. As Dong Zhuo was killed in 192, the chaos in the wake of the collapse of centralized authority only continued, with various warlords attempting to vie for supremacy in order to establish or hold onto their authority within the decaying empire. Meanwhile, Dong Zhuo's former followers Li Jue and Guo Si were left to squabble amongst themselves, while Emperor Xian himself fled and returned to the ravaged city of Luoyang. In 196, he was given refuge by the warlord Cao Cao, who relocated him to the new capital city of Xu, from where he could control the emperor. Cao Cao would further exert his authority by defeating the powerful warlord Yuan Shao at the decisive Battle of Guandu in 200.

== Events ==
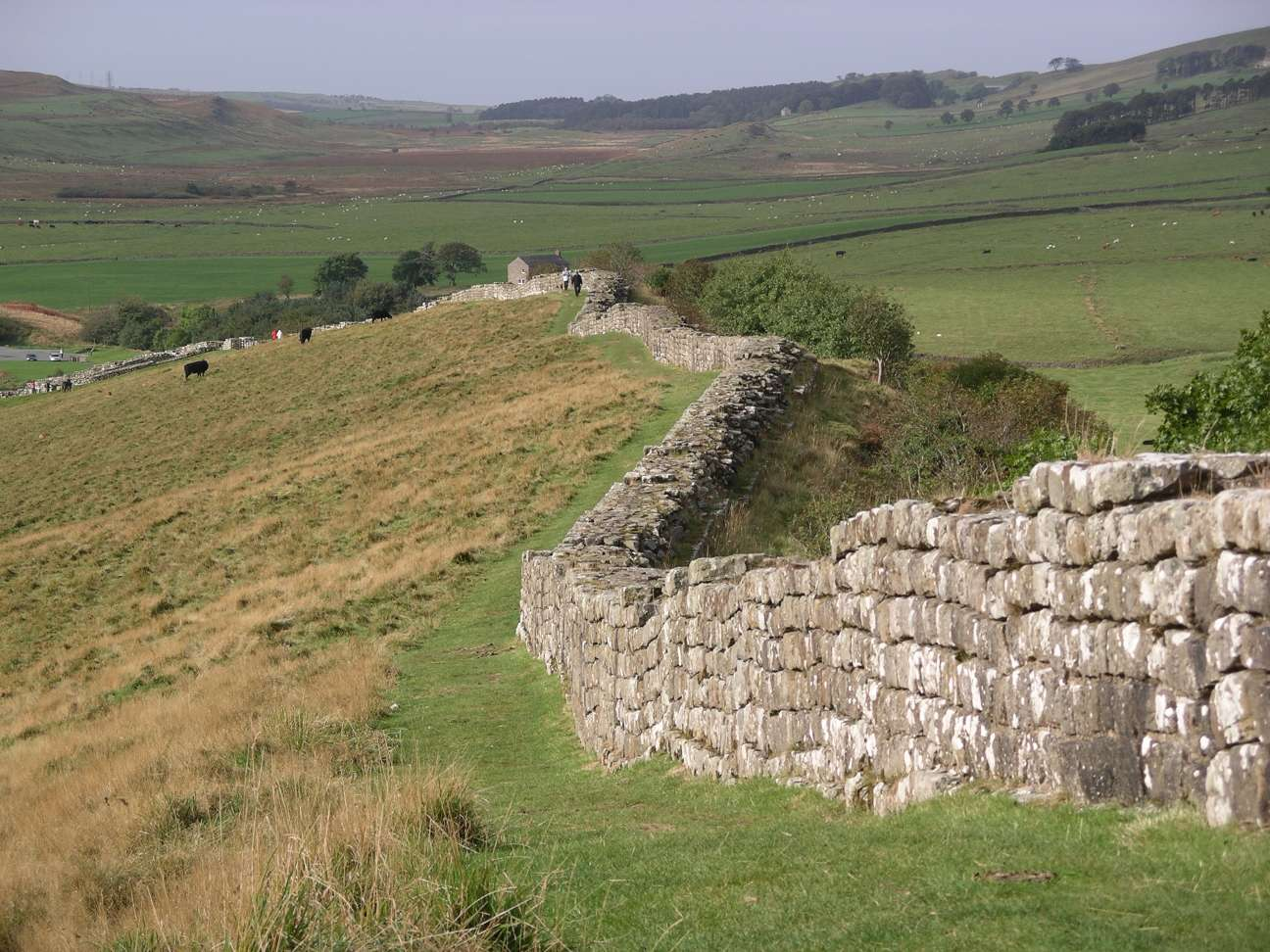
Pieces of Hadrian's Wall remain near Greenhead and along the route, though large sections have been dismantled over the years to use the stones for various nearby construction projects.

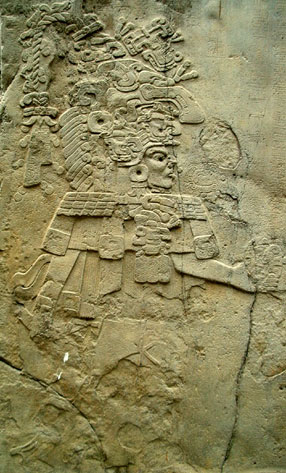
The La Mojarra Stela 1, from Veracruz, Mexico, made by the Epi-Olmec culture in 156.

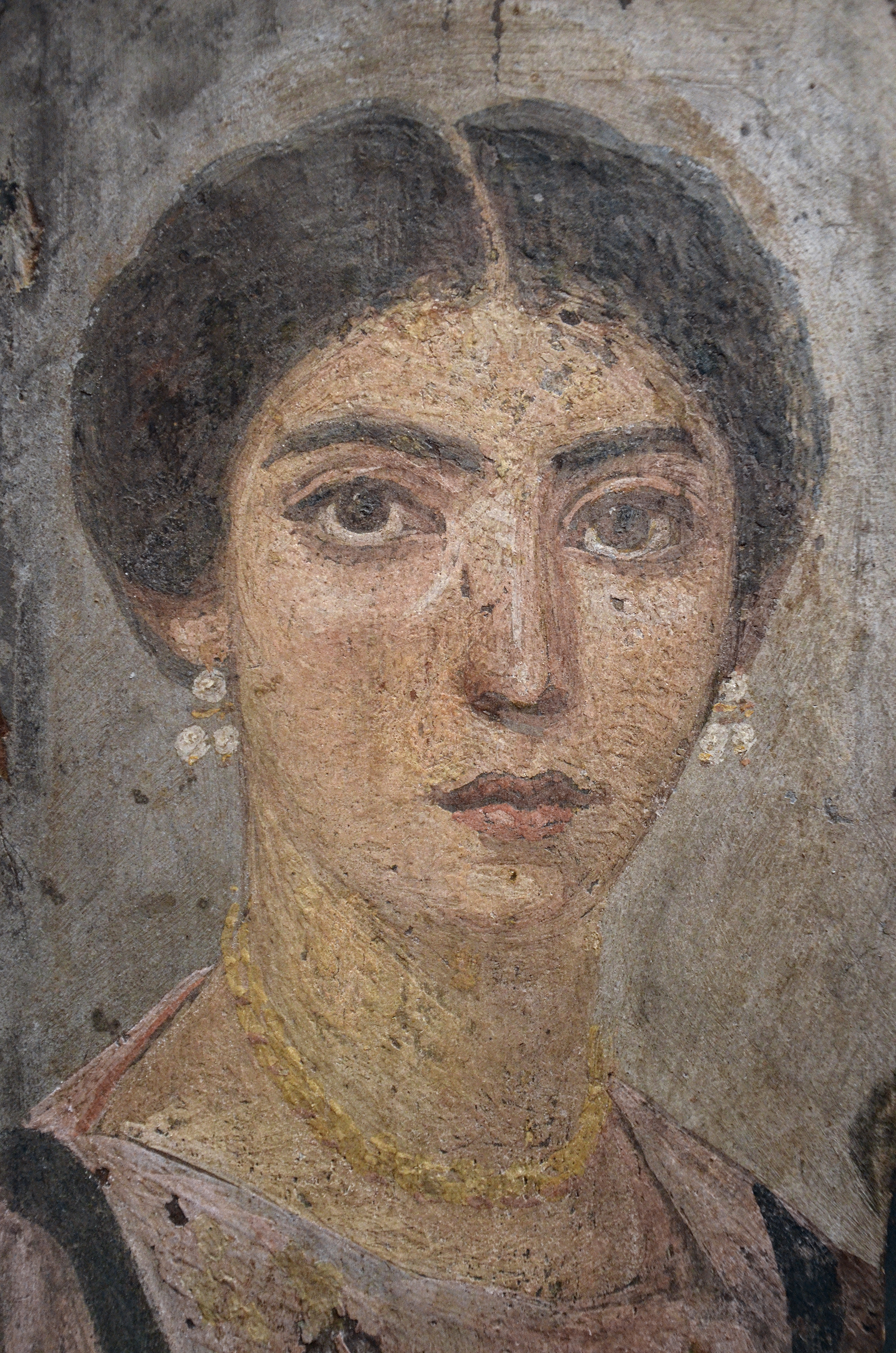
Funeral portrait of a woman, Faiyum, Egypt

- AD 96 – 180: Five Good Emperors of Rome: Nerva, Trajan, Hadrian, Antoninus Pius and Marcus Aurelius.
- 100 – 200: The Grand Anicut, an ancient dam, is constructed by a Chola king.
- 101 – 102, 105 – 106: The Dacian Wars. After two conflicts, Dacia is annexed as a Roman province.
- 114 – 116: A war with Parthia results in Armenia and Mesopotamia being temporarily annexed into the Roman Empire.
- 115 – 117: Kitos War, adjunct to the Jewish–Roman wars.
- 122 – 132: Hadrian's Wall is built across what is now Northern England.
- 127 – 140: The Kushan ruler Kanishka ruled present-day Pakistan and northern India.
- 132 – 135: Bar Kokhba's revolt against Rome.
- 140 – 180: Huvishka, Kushan ruler.
- 142 – 154: The Antonine Wall is built across what is now central Scotland.
- 144: Marcion, rejected by Church of Rome, founds Marcionism.
- 161 – 166: Roman–Parthian War of 161–166.
- 165 – 180: The Antonine Plague in Rome.
- 166 – 180: Marcomannic Wars.
- 166 – 184: Disasters of the Partisan Prohibitions.
- 180 – 192: Reign of Commodus, Roman emperor.
- 184 – 205: The Yellow Turban Rebellion of the Han dynasty in China.
- 184 – 189: The Liang Province Rebellion in northwest China.
- 189 – 220: The end of the Han dynasty.
- 190 – 191: Warlords across China launch a campaign against Dong Zhuo.
- 193: Year of the Five Emperors of Rome: Pertinax, Didius Julianus, Pescennius Niger, Clodius Albinus and Septimius Severus.
- 193 – 211: Reign of the Roman emperor Septimius Severus.
- The Kingdom of Aksum emerges.
- Herakleitos makes The Unswept Floor, mosaic variant of a 2nd-century BC painting by Sosos of Pergamon. It is now kept at the Musei Vaticani in Rome.
- 2nd or 3rd century – Standing Buddha, from Gandhara, Pakistan, is constructed during the Kushan period. It is now kept at Lahore Museum, Lahore.

== Inventions, discoveries, introductions ==
- 105: Cai Lun of China invents paper in its modern form.
- 125: Zhang Heng of China invents the world's first water-powered armillary sphere.
- 132: Zhang Heng of China invents first seismometer to detect the cardinal direction of earthquakes.
- Ptolemy compiles a catalogue of all stars visible to the naked eye. He also compiles three of the most influential books in western history:
  - the Almagest, which becomes the basis for western and Middle Eastern astronomy until the time of Nicolaus Copernicus and Johannes Kepler.
  - the astrological treatise Tetrabiblos.
  - the Geographia.
- Hindu number system: It was developed in the Indian subcontinent between the 1st and 6th centuries AD.
- Carding devices: The earliest evidence for using bow-instruments for carding comes from India.
