= Tiberius Claudius Candidus =

Roman general and senator (died c.198)

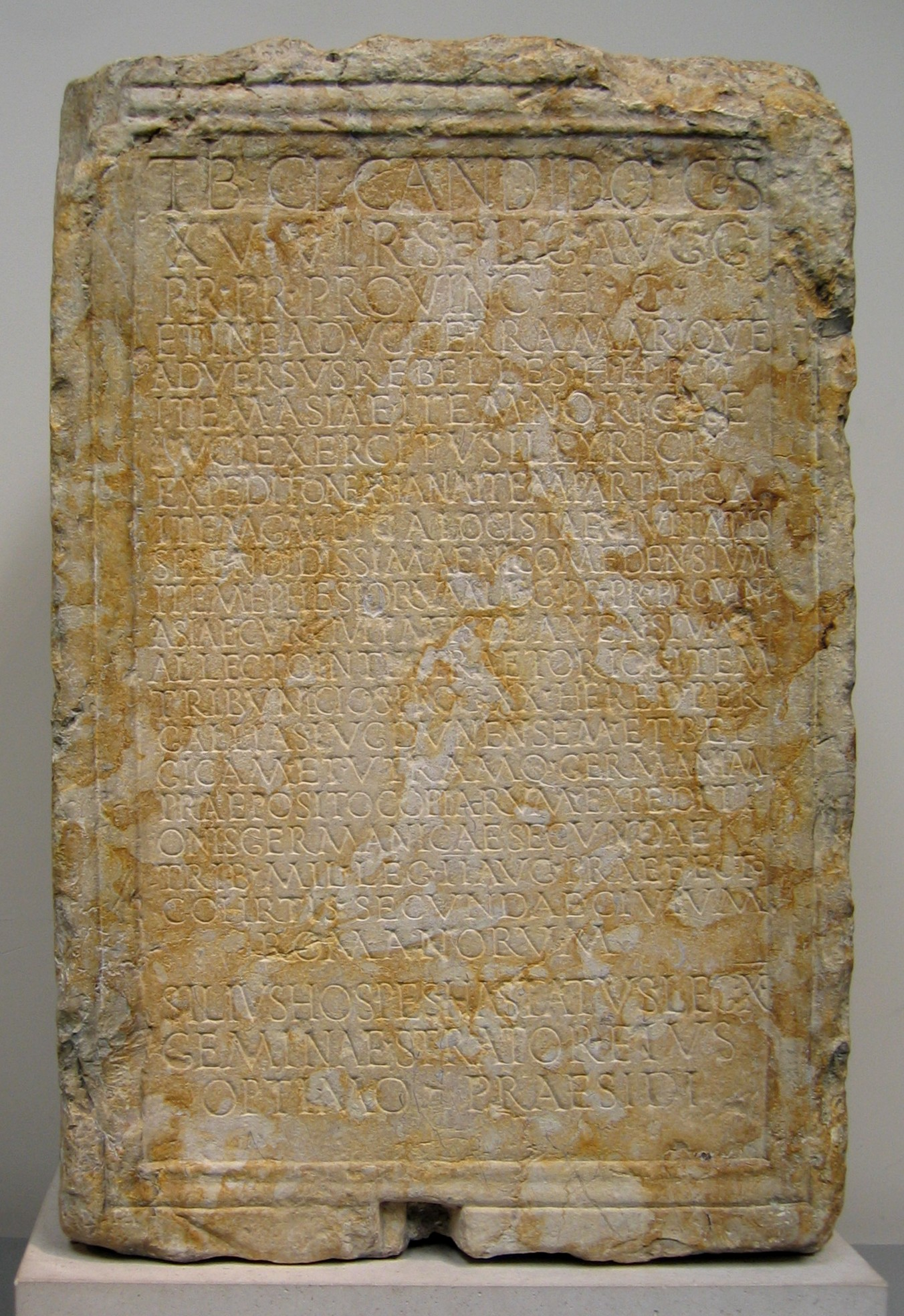
Cursus honorum of Tiberius Claudius Candidus, currently in British Museum

Tiberius Claudius Candidus (died c. 198 CE) was a Roman general and senator. He played an important role supporting Septimius Severus in the struggle for succession following the assassination of the emperor Pertinax in 193 CE.

== Early Career and the War Against Pescennius Niger ==
A member of the equestrian gens Claudia, Candidus began his career in the military, eventually serving as praepositus copiarum (or supply officer) in the emperor Marcus Aurelius’s second expedition against the Germans in 178/9 CE. Then during the reign of Commodus, he was elevated to the rank of Praetor through the imperial adlectio, thereby making him a member of the Roman Senate.

His career continued in the east of the empire, where Candidus served as an assistant to the Roman Governor of the province of Asia before being appointed curator of Nicomedia and Ephesus. He was either serving in the east, or was Legatus legionis of one of the Pannonian legions when Septimius Severus, then governor of Pannonia Superior, declared himself emperor in 193 CE following the murder of Pertinax and the elevation of Didius Julianus.

In preparation for the Expeditio Asiana against Severus's rival Pescennius Niger in the eastern provinces, Severus had a special elite force assembled from the Pannonian legions, the exercitus Illyricus, and placed Candidus in command, giving him the title dux exercitus Illyrici. While the emperor was stationed at Perinthus, Candidus took his troops and crossed the Propontis, meeting and defeating Niger's forces (under the command of Asellius Aemilianus) at the Battle of Cyzicus. In the aftermath, Aemilianus was captured and brought before Candidus, who had him executed.

Niger himself arrived to take command of his troops at Nicaea, and at the Battle of Nicaea fought against Severus's army under Candidus. Candidus was losing the battle before he managed to rally his troops and inflict another defeat on Niger, who fled the battle and proceeded to Antioch. As Candidus marched towards the Taurus Mountains, he proceeded to fine those cities in Asia Minor who had decided to support Niger. It was during this period that Severus replaced Candidus as principal commander with Publius Cornelius Anullinus, possibly due to his failure to prevent the withdrawal of Niger's army at Nicaea. Nevertheless, Candidus remained with the army and fought at the Battle of Issus in 194 CE.

== The Parthian Expedition and the War Against Clodius Albinus ==
With Niger's defeat at Issus and subsequent death, Candidus was appointed Dux adversus rebelles Asiae, tasked with dealing with Niger's remaining supporters in the eastern provinces. Following this, Candidus rejoined Severus in his Expeditio Mesopotamena against the Parthians in 195 CE, where Candidus was once again appointed dux exercitus Illyrici.

After campaigning against Adiabene and Osroene, Candidus was sent back to the western provinces, as Clodius Albinus declared himself Emperor in 196 and invaded the Gallic provinces. It was during this period (either 195 or 196) that Candidus was appointed suffect consul in absentia. Arriving in Noricum, he carried the title Dux adversus rebelles Noricae, and was given the task of rounding up Albinus's supporters in the province. Following this, in 197 CE he returned to commanding the exercitus Illyricus and participated in the Battle of Lugdunum where Albinus was finally defeated.

That same year (197 CE), Candidus was appointed governor of Hispania Tarraconensis, where he was again tasked with hunting down and executing the remaining supporters of Albinus within the province. Around 198 CE, he was subjected to a Damnatio memoriae and was executed. It is unclear as to why this occurred; however it may be linked to a plot against the emperor mentioned in the Historia Augusta, involving some friends of Severus who were put on trial after being accused of planning his death.

== Sources ==
- Kulikowski, Michael; Imperial Triumph: The Roman World from Hadrian to Constantine (2016)
- Mennen, Inge, Power and Status in the Roman Empire, AD 193–284 (2011)
- Potter, David S. The Roman Empire at Bay AD 180–395 (2004)
