= AD 193 =

193 in various calendars
- Gregorian calendar: 193; CXCIII
- Ab urbe condita: 946
- Assyrian calendar: 4943
- Balinese saka calendar: 114–115
- Bengali calendar: −401 – −400
- Berber calendar: 1143
- Buddhist calendar: 737
- Burmese calendar: −445
- Byzantine calendar: 5701–5702
- Chinese calendar: 壬申年 (Water Monkey); 2890 or 2683 — to — 癸酉年 (Water Rooster); 2891 or 2684
- Coptic calendar: −91 – −90
- Discordian calendar: 1359
- Ethiopian calendar: 185–186
- Hebrew calendar: 3953–3954
- Hindu calendars
- Vikram Samvat: 249–250
- Shaka Samvat: 114–115
- Kali Yuga: 3293–3294
- Holocene calendar: 10193
- Iranian calendar: 429 BP – 428 BP
- Islamic calendar: 442 BH – 441 BH
- Javanese calendar: 70–71
- Julian calendar: 193; CXCIII
- Korean calendar: 2526
- Minguo calendar: 1719 before ROC 民前1719年
- Nanakshahi calendar: −1275
- Seleucid era: 504/505 AG
- Thai solar calendar: 735–736
- Tibetan calendar: ཆུ་ཕོ་སྤྲེ་ལོ་ (male Water-Monkey); 319 or −62 or −834 — to — ཆུ་མོ་བྱ་ལོ་ (female Water-Bird); 320 or −61 or −833

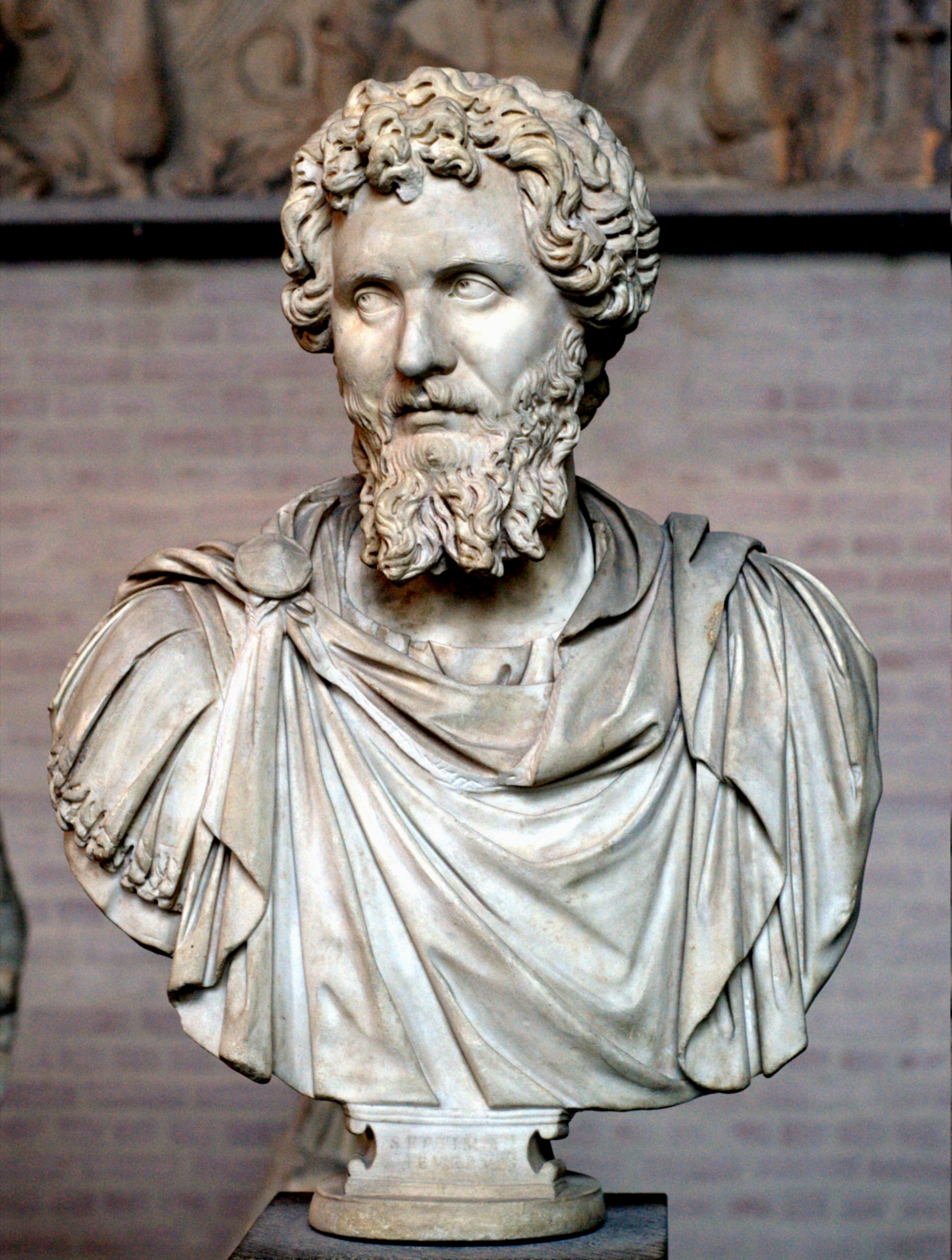
This was the Year of the Five Emperors, in which there were five claimants for the title of Roman Emperor. The five were Pertinax, Didius Julianus, Pescennius Niger, Clodius Albinus and Septimius Severus (pictured). This year started a period of civil war where multiple rulers vied for the chance to become Caesar.

Year 193 (CXCIII) was a common year starting on Monday of the Julian calendar. At the time, it was known as the Year of the Consulship of Sosius and Ericius (or, less frequently, year 946 Ab urbe condita). The denomination 193 for this year has been used since the early medieval period, when the Anno Domini calendar era became the prevalent method in Europe for naming years.

== Events ==
=== By place ===
==== Roman Empire ====
- January 1 – Year of the Five Emperors: The Roman Senate chooses Publius Helvius Pertinax, against his will, to succeed the late Commodus as Emperor. Pertinax is forced to reorganize the handling of finances, which were wrecked under Commodus, to reestablish discipline in the Roman army, and to suspend the food programs established by Trajan, provoking the ire of the Praetorian Guard.
- March 28 – Pertinax is assassinated by members of the Praetorian Guard, who storm the imperial palace. The Empire is auctioned off; Marcus Didius Julianus the highest bidder, offers 300 million sesterces for the throne. Roman governors Clodius Albinus (Britannia) and Pescennius Niger (Syria) claim, with support of their troops, the imperial throne.
- April 14 – Lucius Septimius Severus is proclaimed Emperor by his troops at Carnuntum, in Pannonia Superior (Balkans). He marches with his army to Rome.
- June 1 – Septimius Severus enters the capital, and has Julianus put to death. He replaces the Praetorian Guard with a 15,000-man force from the Danubian legions, and gains control of the Roman Empire, beginning the Severan dynasty.
- Battle of Cyzicus and Battle of Nicaea (Asia Minor): Septimius Severus defeats the army under Pescennius.
- In Britain, Clodius Albinus allies with Septimius Severus, and accepts the title of Caesar. British tribes take advantage of the disorder in the Empire, and damage Hadrian's Wall. Extensive repairs to the defence work is carried out by the legionaries.
- Counterfeiting workshops begin to appear throughout the Roman Empire.
- The Council of Rome, the pre-ecumenical council

==== China ====
- Last (4th) year of Chuping era of the Chinese Han dynasty.
- Cao Cao's invasion of Xu Province: Cao Cao invades Tao Qian's Xu Province, holding him responsible for the death of Cao Song.

=== By topic ===
==== Commerce ====
- The silver content of the Roman denarius falls to 50 percent under emperor Septimius Severus, down from 68 percent under Marcus Aurelius.

== Births ==
- Luo Tong, Chinese official of the Eastern Wu state (d. 228)
- Zhang Wen, Chinese official of the Eastern Wu state (d. 230)

== Deaths ==
- March 28 – Pertinax, Roman emperor (assassinated) (b. 126)
- June 1 – Didius Julianus, Roman emperor (assassinated)
- Adrianus (or Hadrian), Greek sophist, philosopher and writer
- Cao Song (or Jugao), Chinese official and father of Cao Cao
- Liu Yu (or Bo'an), Chinese nobleman, official and warlord
- Tiberius Claudius Pompeianus, Roman general and politician
