= Battle of Issus (disambiguation) =

Battle of Issus may refer to:

- Battle of Issus (or 'The Battle at Issus') (333 BC), a battle in which Alexander the Great of Macedonia defeated Darius III of Persia.
- Battle of Issus (194), the third major battle fought between Roman Emperor Septimius Severus and his rival Pescennius Niger.
- Battle of Issus (622) (or 'Third Battle of Issus'), a name sometimes used in older sources for an alleged battle between Eastern Roman Emperor Heraclius and the Sassanid Empire at Issus during the emperor's 622 campaign. Modern scholarly sources place it in Cappadocia instead.

The first of these battles is the subject of two notable artworks, and in the context of art it is usually referred to as the Battle of Alexander at Issus or simply the Battle of Alexander.

- The Alexander Mosaic of Pompeii depicts a battle between Alexander and Darius. It is commonly believed to be the battle of Issus rather than the Battle of Gaugamela, another in which Darius was Alexander's adversary.
- The Battle of Alexander at Issus (1528–9) by Albrecht Altdorfer.
