= Battle of Nicaea =

Battle between Septimius Severus and Pescennius Niger (193)

Coordinates: 40°25.72′N 29°43.12′E

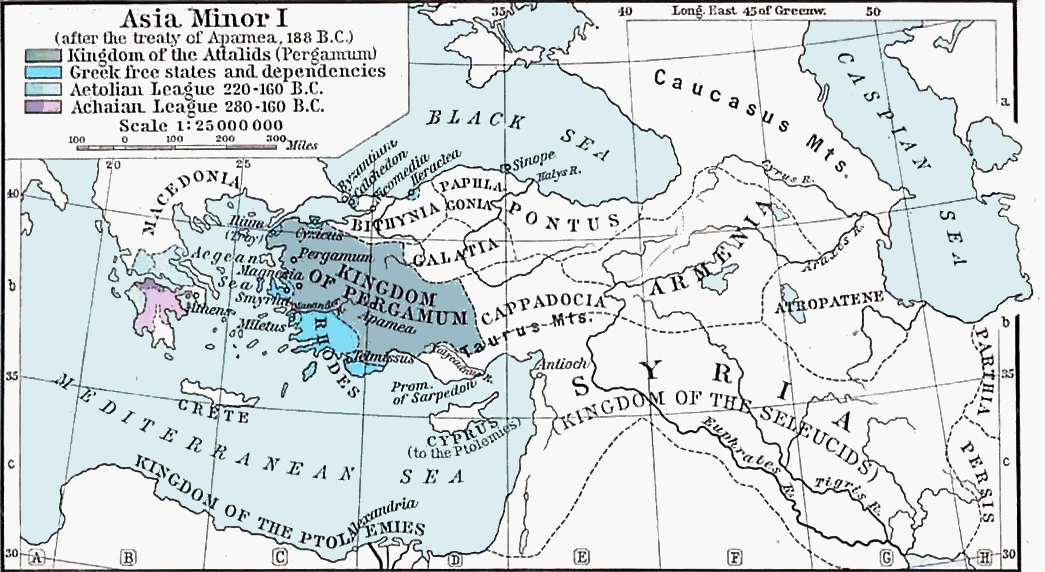
- The Growth of Roman Power in Asia Minor
Location	Nicaea in Anatolia (modern-day İznik, Bursa, Turkey)
Result	victory for Septimius Severus

Belligerents
Forces of Septimius Severus	Forces of Pescennius Niger

Commanders and leaders
Septimius Severus	Pescennius Niger

The Battle of Nicaea was fought in 193 between the forces of Septimius Severus and his eastern rival, Pescennius Niger. It took place at Nicaea in Asia Minor. Severus defeated his rival, and ended his bid for the Roman Empire the next year at Issus.

== Background ==
The battle took place in the context of the Year of the Five Emperors, a tumultuous period in the Roman Empire when Emperor Pertinax was assassinated by the Praetorian Guards. The Praetorian Guards then held an auction for the throne, which was won by Didius Julianus, who became emperor. The auction was unpopular, and Septimius Severus, commander of the Pannonian legions, and Pescennius Niger, the governor of Syria (as well as Clodius Albinus, the governor of Britain) all claimed the Roman imperial throne after the auction.

Severus marched to Rome and had Didius decapitated, then marched to meet Pescennius in battle. Severus had previously defeated Pescennius at the Battle of Cyzicus (193) in Asia Minor.

== See also ==
- List of Roman wars and battles
