= Issus (Cilicia) =

Ancient Greek archaeological site in Turkey

Coordinates: 36°51′13″N 36°09′25″E

The geographical location of Issus is along a strategic bottleneck between inland mountainous terrain on a coastal plain within the current Turkish province of Hatay.

Issus (Latin; Phoenician: Sissu) or Issos (Ancient Greek: Ἰσσός, Issós, or Ἰσσοί, Issoí) was an ancient settlement on the strategic coastal plain straddling the small Pinarus River (a fast melt-water stream several metres wide) below the navigationally difficult inland mountains towering above to the east in the Turkish Province of Hatay, near the border with Syria. It can be identified with Kinet Höyük in the village of Yeşilköy near Dörtyol in Turkey's Hatay Province. Excavations on the mound occurred between 1992 and 2012 by Bilkent University. It is most notable for being the place of no fewer than three decisive ancient or medieval battles each called in their own era the Battle of Issus:

1. The Battle of Issus (333 BC) or the First Battle of Issus, in which Alexander the Great of Macedonia defeated Darius III of Persia
2. Battle of Issus (194) or the Second Battle of Issus, in which P. Cornelius Anullinus defeated Septimius Severus's rival Pescennius Niger
3. Battle of Issus (622) or the Third Battle of Issus, in which the Byzantine emperor Heraclius defeated the Sassanid shah Shahrbaraz

Whether Issus is still present within a modern settlement is hotly debated among researchers. Regardless of which mountain brook was the locus of the battles, the old town was situated close to present-day İskenderun, Turkey, in the Gulf of İskenderun. Today, no town exists on both sides of the Pinarus river, which may or may not have been called Issus.

Although Issus was once considered to have been an episcopal see, there is no evidence to support that idea: Issus is not mentioned in the "Notitiae Episcopatuum" of the Patriarchate of Antioch, to which the Roman province of Cilicia belonged.
