= Lucius Fabius Cilo =

Late 2nd/early 3rd century Roman senator, general and consul

Lucius Fabius Cilo, full name Lucius Fabius Cilo Septiminus Catinius Acilianus Lepidus Fulcinianus, was a Roman senator, who was a confidant of Septimius Severus. He held a number of appointments that have been dated to the reigns of Commodus and Severus. He was twice Roman consul: the first time in 193 as a suffect, and the second time as ordinary consul in 204 with Marcus Annius Flavius Libo as his colleague. Cilo is known from numerous inscriptions and appears in the Historia Augusta and the history of Dio Cassius. He married Cilonia Fabia.

== Earlier career ==
Fabius Cilo came from Hispania. Paul M. M. Leunissen writes it is possible he came from Baetica, while Anthony Birley suggests his home town was Iluro. Because the last known member of the republican and Patrician family of the Fabii was Paullus Fabius Persicus who died in the reign of Claudius, it is likely that Cilo was descended from one of the clientes or freedmen of that house. Ronald Syme notes that there are about 300 Fabii known in the Spanish provinces, as well as fifty in Gallia Narbonensis. Details are lacking how and when Cilo came to Rome.

His cursus honorum is known from two inscriptions on statue bases found in Rome. The earliest office Cilo held was in the decemviri stlitibus judicandis, one of the four boards that formed the vigintiviri; membership in one of these four boards was a preliminary and required first step toward a gaining entry into the Roman Senate. Next he received a commission as military tribune with Legio XI Claudia, which was stationed at Durostorum (modern Silistra) in Moesia Inferior, on the southern banks of the Danube. Once he completed his service, Cilo returned to Rome where he was appointed quaestor for the senatorial province of Crete and Cyrenaica and, upon completion of this traditional Republican magistracy, Cilo was enrolled in the Senate. He went on to plebeian tribune, after which he served as legate or assistant to the proconsul of Gallia Narbonensis. Cilo then once again returned to Rome, where he advanced to the urban praetor. Once a senator had completed his duties as praetor, he was eligible to hold a number of important responsibilities.

The first appointment Cilo received after concluding his duties as praetor was as legatus legionis or commander of Legio XVI Flavia Firma, which was stationed in Roman Syria. Leunissen dates his service as falling between 180 and 184. Around 185, he became proconsul of the Roman Province of Gallia Narbonensis. Back in Rome, he was appointed praefectus of the aerarii militaris. His tenure in this civilian post is estimated as running from 187 to 189. Cilo then left this appointment to serve as legatus or governor of Galatia from around 189 until he returned to Rome towards the end of 192 to serve as suffect consul at some point in the following year.

== Partisan of Severus ==
Moving from the dry account provided by the honorary inscriptions to the account provided by written histories, we find with the death of Commodus, Fabius Cilo acquired importance as a partisan of Septimius Severus. Anthony Birley lists a number of opportunities for Cilo and Severus to have met and/or continued their friendship. Birley dates Severus' first arrival in Rome to 164 and believes Cilo arrived in the city not long afterwards. While Cilo was in command of his legion in Syria, Severus was legatus legionis of Legio IV Scythica, also stationed in Syria. A third time the two were in near proximity was when Cilo governed Narbonensis and Severus was legatus or governor of the adjacent province of Gallia Lugdunensis. Regardless of the date their friendship began, it can be assumed they were friends by the time Commodus was assassinated.

It is with Commodus' death that Cilo enters the written history, for the Historia Augusta mentions that Livius Larensis had given the Emperor's corpse to Cilo. Birley suggests the reason Cilo received the slain emperor's body was because by this time he was a member of the sodalis Hadrianalis (a priestly order that other sources say he belonged to) and had placed it in the Mausoleum of Hadrian, where a funerary inscription for Commodus can be found. Except for that one act, Cilo was largely uninvolved in the tumult in the following days up to 1 June when Severus assumed the throne. Birley suggests that Cilo was responsible for protecting Severus' sons, who were in Rome during these months, and prevented them from being used as hostages against Severus. But following Severus' march on Rome, the new emperor assigned Cilo a title that was proudly displayed on the statue bases found at Rome: comes Imperatoris—companion of the Emperor.

Cilo was given command of a mixed force of soldiers known as a vexillatio, and proceeded to Thracia. The following year he fought against Severus' rival Pescennius Niger near Perinthus, and his troops suffered heavy casualties. An army drawn from the legions garrisoned along the Danube under Tiberius Claudius Candidus arrived to relieve Cilo, and in Autumn 194 crossed the Sea of Marmara, outflanking Niger. Candidus defeated Niger's army near Nicea. Following this victory, Cilo was made governor of Bithynia and Pontus, securing the rear of the advancing Septimian forces. Once Niger was defeated, and he could turn his attention to his other rival, Clodius Albinus, Severus reassigned Clio first to govern the frontline province of Moesia Superior (Leunissen dates this appointment to 195), then the strategic province of Pannonia Superior (from 197 to 201/202. This appointment demonstrates that Cilo was regarded as a trusted associate who could watch over matters while away from Rome.

From Pannonia, Cilo returned to Rome to hold the office of urban prefect. Leunissen dates his tenure from around 202 to some point between the death of Severus (4 February 211) and the death of Geta (26 December 211). While in that office, he saved the life of procurator and, later, emperor Marcus Opellius Macrinus when his patron Gaius Fulvius Plautianus fell into disgrace. He also served as consul for the second time while Urban Prefect (in 204).

A domus on the Aventine was given as a present by Severus to Cilo. This domus, showed also in the Forma Urbis Romae, is under the basilica and the monastery of Santa Balbina, and was close to the horti Ciloniae Fabiae.

== Life under Caracalla ==
Cilo served also under Caracalla, Septimus Severus' oldest son. When the emperor decided to kill his own brother and co-ruler Geta and Papinian, Cilo, who had counselled harmony between the brothers, was seized by the urbaniciani, and only after the soldiers had torn off his senator's robe and pulled off his boots, Caracalla stopped them. According to Cassius Dio:

He [Caracalla] also wished to take the life of Cilo, his tutor and benefactor, who had served as prefect of the city under his father, and whom he himself had often called "father." The soldiers who were sent to Cilo first plundered his silver plate, his robes, his money, and everything else of his, and then led him along the Sacred Way with the purpose of taking him to the palace and there putting him out of the way; he had only low slippers on his feet, since he had chanced to be in the bath when arrested, and was wearing a short tunic. The soldiers tore the clothing off his body and disfigured his face, so that the populace as well as the city troops began to make an outcry; accordingly, Antoninus, in awe and fear of them, met the party, and shielding Cilo with his cavalry cloak (he was wearing military dress), cried out: "Insult not my father! Strike not my tutor!" As for the military tribune who had been bidden to slay him and the detail of soldiers sent with him, they were put to death, ostensibly because they had plotted Cilo's destruction, but in reality because they had not killed him.
Antoninus pretended to love Cilo to such a degree that he declared, "Those who have plotted against him have plotted against me" [...]

Political offices
Preceded by Lucius Julius Messala Rutilianus; Gaius Aemilius Severus Cantabrinus as suffecti	Roman consul 193 (suffect) with ignotus	Succeeded by Septimius Severus II; Clodius Albinus II as ordinarii
Preceded by Gaius Fulvius Plautianus II; Publius Septimius Geta II	Roman consul 204 with Marcus Annius Flavius Libo	Succeeded by Lucius Pomponius Liberalis, and ignotus as suffecti
