= Battle of Lugdunum =

Battle between Septimius Severus and Clodius Albinus (197)

- Part of the Year of the Five Emperors
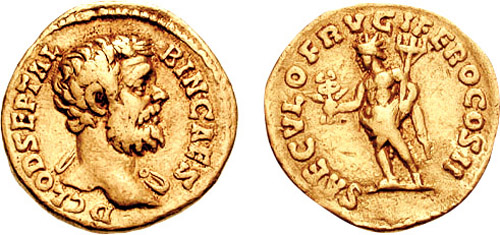
- Clodius Albinus, as Caesar, 193–195 AD. AV Aureus (7.22 gm, 5h). Rome mint. Struck 194 AD.
Date	19 February 197
Location	Lugdunum (modern Lyon) 45.76°N 4.85°E
Result	Severan victory

Belligerents
Roman units from Pannonia, Illyricum, Moesia, and Dacia	Roman units from Britannia and Hispania

Commanders and leaders
Septimius Severus	Clodius Albinus †

Strength
65,000 - 150,000	55,000 - 150,000

Casualties and losses
Unknown but severe	Unknown but severe

The Battle of Lugdunum, also called the Battle of Lyon, was fought on 19 February 197 at Lugdunum (modern Lyon, France), between the armies of the Roman emperor Septimius Severus and of the Roman usurper Claudius Albinus. Severus' victory finally established him as the sole emperor of the Roman Empire following the Year of the Five Emperors and immediate aftermath.

This battle is said to have been the largest, most hard-fought, and bloodiest of all clashes between Roman forces. According to English historian Edward Gibbon, the Roman historian Cassius Dio placed the total number of Roman soldiers engaged for both sides combined at 150,000. Historian Michael Kulikowski states that Severus led the much larger force with the combined legions of Dacia and the Danubian provinces. Historian A. J. Graham supports Gibbon's number of 150,000 soldiers in total, rather than the sometimes cited number of 300,000 in total and therefore 150,000 on each side, which he states to be a commonly accepted mistranslation of Cassius Dio's original language. Graham also analyses the possible forces available to Albinus and states that the numbers on each side could have been roughly equal.

== Background ==
Following the murder of Emperor Pertinax by the Praetorian Guards on 28 March 193 after a reign of only 3 months, a struggle began for the succession to the throne of the Roman Empire, resulting in the Year of the Five Emperors. After the murder of Pertinax, despite the dismay and demonstrations of the plebeians, the praetorians auctioned the empire to the highest bidder, Didius Julianus. The disenchanted Roman crowd called out the name of Pescennius Niger, governor of Roman Syria, who controlled three legions, to come to Rome to take over. When Pescennius Niger heard the news of Pertinax's death, he proclaimed himself emperor and gained the support of 10 legions in total. Meanwhile, Septimius Severus, governor of Pannonia Superior, and also a commander of three legions, had been proclaimed emperor by his legions. Severus promised to avenge the murder of Pertinax, who had been held in high regard by the soldiers. Before moving on Rome to overthrow Didius Julianus, Severus made an alliance with the powerful commander of the three legions and 70 auxiliary regiments in Britannia, Clodius Albinus Severus recognized Albinus as Caesar and apparent heir to himself as Augustus. Albinus accepted this arrangement.

Severus, who was located closer to Rome than Pescennius Niger, soon gained the support of 16 western legions and headed to Rome. As Severus approached Rome, by the end of May 193, Didius Julianus lost all support and was killed in the palace by a soldier on 2 June 193. The Roman Senate then acclaimed Severus as emperor. Before Severus entered the city, he disbanded the Praetorian Guards and replaced them with his own soldiers. After less than a month, Severus headed out to face Pescennius Niger. Commanders loyal to Severus promptly attacked and diminished Niger's forces. Other provinces and cities in the eastern areas of the empire then began to defect to Severus. Severus travelled to Perinthus where he gave command of the campaign against Niger to Publius Cornelius Anullinus whose legions defeated and destroyed Niger's forces at the Battle of Issus (194). Niger was captured and executed at Antioch. After arriving at Antioch and consolidating his position, in 195, Severus conducted a campaign against the minor kingdoms Osroene and Adiabene, wresting control of those areas from Parthia.

Severus then tried to strengthen his position as Augustus, by describing himself as the son of Marcus Aurelius and brother of Commodus. He also raised his own young son, Bassianus, more commonly known as Caracalla, to the rank of Caesar and gave him the name Marcus Aurelius Antoninus. This broke Severus' alliance with Albinus, presenting an obvious threat to Albinus which he countered by declaring himself Augustus. The Roman Senate declared Albinus to be a public enemy on 15 December 195. By early 196, Severus had installed his ally Publius Cornelius Anullinus as urban prefect of Rome in another move to consolidate his position. The stage was now set for a civil war between the forces being gathered by Severus and Albinus, ultimately culminating in the Battle of Lugdunum.

== Revolt and preliminary moves ==
In 196, after being hailed as emperor by his troops, Clodius Albinus took 40,000 men in three legions from Britannia to Gaul. After gathering up additional forces, he set up headquarters at Lugdunum. He was joined there by Lucius Novius Rufus, the governor of Hispania Tarraconensis, and by the Legio VII Gemina under his command. But Severus had the powerful Danubian and German legions on his side. To try to minimise this advantage and possibly win their support, Albinus struck first against the German forces under Virius Lupus, governor of Germania Inferior. Albinus defeated them, but not decisively enough to challenge their allegiance to Severus. Albinus then considered invading Italy, but Severus had prepared for this by reinforcing the garrisons of the Alpine passes. Not wishing to risk the losses or the delay that forcing the passes would cause, Albinus was deterred.

In the winter of 196–197, Severus gathered his forces along the Danube and marched into Gaul, where, much to his surprise, he found that Albinus' forces were about as strong as his own. The two armies first clashed at Tinurtium (Tournus), where Severus had the better day but was unable to obtain the decisive victory he needed.

== Battle ==
Albinus's army fell back to Lugdunum; Severus followed, and on 19 February 197, the massive and ultimately decisive battle finally commenced. The exact details are as vague as the exact numbers involved. However, we do know both sides were roughly evenly matched and it was therefore a bloody and drawn-out affair lasting over two days (it was rare for battles of this time to last longer than a few hours). The tide shifted many times during the course of the battle, with the outcome hanging in the balance.

It seems Severus had the edge in cavalry, which swung the battle in his favour for the final time. Exhausted and bloodied, Albinus' army was crushed. He also had battle-hardened legions who were veterans of the brutal war against the Marcomanni in the Danube region called Pannonia, and where Severus had been governor.

== Aftermath ==
Historian Michael Kulikowski states that Albinus fled into Lugdunum where he took his own life. Severus had Albinus' body stripped and beheaded. He rode over the headless corpse with his horse in front of his victorious troops. Severus sent Albinus's head back to Rome as a warning. He had Albinus's body and those of his wife and sons thrown into the Rhone River. Lucius Novius Rufus, who had supported Albinus, was killed. Severus also had 29 senators who supported Albinus executed.

In Lugdunum itself, Severus remodelled the Imperial cult sanctuary to celebrate his dominance and humiliate Albinus' provincial supporters. According to Duncan Fishwick, the reformed Imperial rites at Lugdunum resembled those due a master from his slaves.

At some point after this battle, the province of Britain was broken up into Upper and Lower halves (Latin: Britannia Superior & Inferior). Roman forces in Britannia were also severely weakened, which would lead to incursions, uprisings, and a withdrawal of Rome from the Antonine Wall south to Hadrian's Wall. It was while quelling one of these uprisings that Severus himself would die near Eboracum on 4 February 211, only weeks short of the 14th anniversary of his victory at Lugdunum.
