= Battle of Issus (194) =

Battle between Septimius Severus and Pescennius Niger (194)

Coordinates: 36°50′18″N 36°09′52″E

- Part of Year of the Five Emperors
Date	AD 194
Location	Issus, Asia Minor (modern-day Kinet Höyük, Yeşilköy, Dörtyol, Hatay, Turkey)
Result	Severan victory

Belligerents
Forces of Septimius Severus	Forces of Pescennius Niger

Commanders and leaders
Publius Cornelius Anullinus	Pescennius Niger

Casualties and losses
Unknown	20,000 according to Cassius Dio

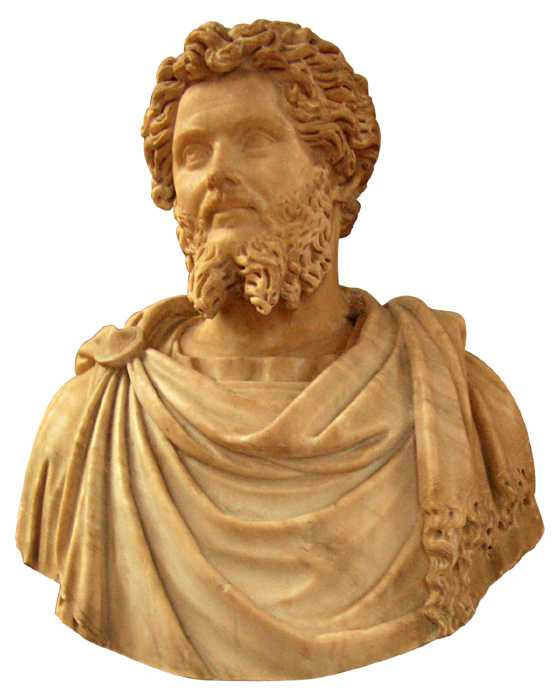
Armoured bust with paludamentum of Roman Emperor Septimius Severus (AD 193-211)

The Battle of Issus was the third major battle in AD 194 between the forces of Emperor Septimius Severus and his rival, Pescennius Niger, part of the Year of the Five Emperors. The Severan forces, commanded by Publius Cornelius Anullinus, won the battle, and Niger was captured and killed shortly afterwards. A triumphal arch commemorating the Severan victory was erected on the site of the battle.

== Background ==
Pescennius Niger was the Roman governor of Syria who had been acclaimed Emperor by his troops, like Severus, following the death of Pertinax.

Following its successive defeats at Cyzicus and Battle of Nicaea in 193, Niger's army successfully withdrew to the Taurus Mountains, where it fiercely defended the Cilician pass. At this time, the commander of the Severan troops, Tiberius Claudius Candidus, was replaced by Publius Cornelius Anullinus, perhaps due to the failure of the former to prevent the withdrawal of the rival army.

== Battle ==
Eventually, Anullinus entered Syria, and the final battle took place in May 194, near Issus, the place where Alexander the Great had defeated the Persian King Darius III in 332 BC. Severus took advantage of the control he had on the lives of the children of the provincial governors, who were left at Rome, and of the rivalries of the cities in the region, thus encouraging governors to change sides, one legion to desert to him, and some cities to revolt.

Severan troops attacked first, while Niger's forces were hurling missiles onto them. According to Dio, Severan legionaries applied testudo, using their shields for protecting either themselves or their own missile shooters (however, it seems that it was not the real testudo that was used in sieges or against highly mobile attackers). At the same time, the Severan cavalry attacked from the rear. The fight was hard, but in the end, Severus won decisively and Niger fled back to Antioch. A sudden thunderstorm played some role in lowering the morale of Niger's troops, who were directly facing it, because they had attributed it to divine intervention.

A triumphal arch was set on site, commemorating the victory of Severus.

== Aftermath ==
While this battle concluded hostilities on the field between the two rivals for control of the East (Niger was captured and killed, a few days later), the city of Byzantium withstood a siege by Severan troops until AD 196, possibly on the hope that a third rival to the principate, the governor of Britain Clodius Albinus, nominally allied with Niger, would defeat Severus in the West. The opposite occurred at the Battle of Lugdunum.
