= Lady of Doxa =

- Year: 2nd century
- Location: Archeological Museum of Alexandroupoli

The Lady of Doxa is an ancient marble sculpture depicting a female figure, dating to the 2nd century which was discovered in 1989 at the site of "Tsiairia" near the village of Doxa, in Evros, Greece.

Today it is housed in the Archeological Museum of Alexandroupoli.
