= AD 115 =

115 in various calendars
- Gregorian calendar: 115; CXV
- Ab urbe condita: 868
- Assyrian calendar: 4865
- Balinese saka calendar: 36–37
- Bengali calendar: −479 – −478
- Berber calendar: 1065
- Buddhist calendar: 659
- Burmese calendar: −523
- Byzantine calendar: 5623–5624
- Chinese calendar: 甲寅年 (Wood Tiger); 2812 or 2605 — to — 乙卯年 (Wood Rabbit); 2813 or 2606
- Coptic calendar: −169 – −168
- Discordian calendar: 1281
- Ethiopian calendar: 107–108
- Hebrew calendar: 3875–3876
- Hindu calendars
- Vikram Samvat: 171–172
- Shaka Samvat: 36–37
- Kali Yuga: 3215–3216
- Holocene calendar: 10115
- Iranian calendar: 507 BP – 506 BP
- Islamic calendar: 523 BH – 522 BH
- Javanese calendar: N/A
- Julian calendar: 115; CXV
- Korean calendar: 2448
- Minguo calendar: 1797 before ROC 民前1797年
- Nanakshahi calendar: −1353
- Seleucid era: 426/427 AG
- Thai solar calendar: 657–658
- Tibetan calendar: ཤིང་ཕོ་སྟག་ལོ་ (male Wood-Tiger); 241 or −140 or −912 — to — ཤིང་མོ་ཡོས་ལོ་ (female Wood-Hare); 242 or −139 or −911

Year 115 (CXV) was a common year starting on Monday of the Julian calendar. In the Roman Empire, it was known as the Year of the Consulship of Messalla and Vergilianus (or, less frequently, year 868 Ab urbe condita). The denomination 115 for this year has been used since the early medieval period, when the Anno Domini calendar era became the prevalent method in Europe for naming years.

== Events ==
=== By place ===
==== Roman Empire ====
- Emperor Trajan is cut off in southern Mesopotamia after his invasion of that region.
- Trajan captures the Parthian capital of Ctesiphon.
- The Diaspora Revolt erupts almost simultaneously across various Jewish diaspora communities in the empire's east, including Egypt, Libya and Cyprus.
- Alexandria in Egypt is damaged during the Jewish-Greek civil wars. Marcus Rutilius Lupus, the Roman governor, sends Legio XXII Deiotariana to protect the inhabitants of Memphis.
- A revolt breaks out in Britain; the garrison at Eboracum (York) is massacred.
- The Pantheon of Agrippa is reconstructed in Rome.

==== Asia ====
- An earthquake destroys Apamea and Antioch in Syria. The local bishop is held responsible (he will be martyred and remembered as St. Ignatius).

=== By topic ===
==== Religion ====
- Pope Sixtus I succeeds Alexander I as the seventh pope of Rome (according to Catholic biographies).

== Births ==
- Pausanias, Greek historian and geographer (d. 180)
- Shun of Han, Chinese emperor of the Han dynasty (d. 144)

== Deaths ==
- Alexander I, bishop of Rome (approximate date)
- Dio Chrysostom, Greek philosopher and historian (b. AD 40)
