= Asellia gens =

The Asellia gens was an ancient Roman clan.

== Members ==
=== Republican ===
- Marcus Asellius, Tribune of the plebs in 422 BC
- Marcus (M. f.) Asellius, senator in 44 BC and friend of Cluentius of Pro Cluentio.
- Lucius Asellius, praetor in 33 BC.
- (L. f.) Asellius, Praetor suffectus in 33 BC.

=== Imperial ===
- Asellius Sabinus, awarded 200,000 sesterces by emperor Tiberius for a dialogue between a truffle, a fig-pecker, an oyster, and a thrush.
- Asellius Aemilianus, supporter of Pescennius Niger.

== See also ==
- List of Roman gentes
