= Quintus Aemilius Laetus =

Praetorian Guard prefect (died 193)

- Born: Thaenae, Roman Africa (modern-day Sfax, Tunisia)
- Died: Rome, Roman Empire
- Allegiance: Roman Empire
- Branch: Praetorian Guard
- Service years: Late 2nd century CE
- Rank: Praetorian Prefect
- Commands: Praetorian Guard

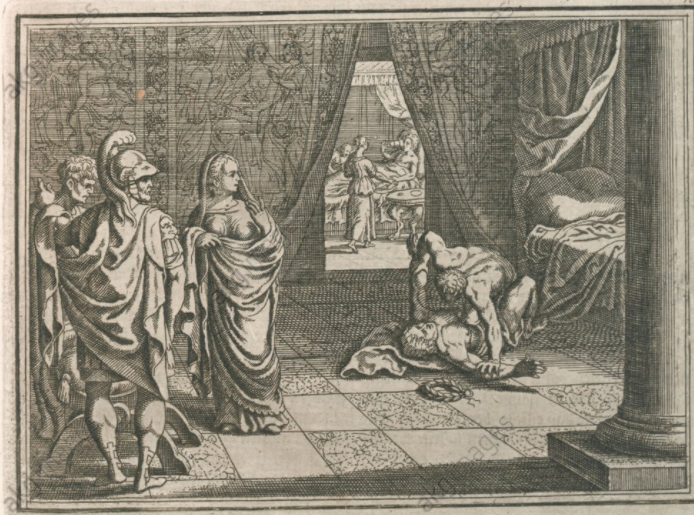
Commodus is strangled by Narcissus due to the conspiracy

Quintus Aemilius Laetus (fl. late 2nd century CE; d. 193) was a Roman military officer and Praetorian Guard prefect under the emperors Commodus and Pertinax. He played a key role in the assassination of Commodus and the political turmoil that followed during the Year of the Five Emperors.

== Early life and background ==
Quintus Aemilius Laetus was born in Thaenae, in the Roman province of Africa, corresponding to modern-day Sfax, Tunisia. His family was originally non-Roman and appears to have obtained Roman citizenship generations earlier. As was customary, they adopted the family name of their patron, likely Marcus Aemilius Lepidus of the prominent Aemilii family, which is why Laetus bore the nomen Aemilius. Little else is known of his early life, but he later entered the Praetorian Guard and rose through the ranks to become praetorian prefect under Commodus by 191 CE.

== Career under Commodus ==
During the final years of Commodus’ reign, the emperor became increasingly erratic. Laetus, as praetorian prefect, commanded significant influence over the Praetorian Guard and the politics of Rome. He was implicated in the conspiracy that assassinated Commodus on 31 December 192 CE, alongside the chamberlain Eclectus and the emperor’s mistress Marcia.

== Role in the accession of Pertinax ==
After Commodus’ death, Laetus and the Praetorian Guard proclaimed Pertinax as emperor. Pertinax attempted to restore military discipline and reduce the donativum expectations of the Guard. This angered the soldiers, who eventually rebelled when promised payments were only partially fulfilled. Laetus is reported to have deserted Pertinax during the rebellion on 28 March 193 CE, which ended with the emperor’s assassination.

== The auction of the empire ==
Following Pertinax’s murder, the Praetorian Guard auctioned the imperial title. Laetus participated in this process, which resulted in Didius Julianus buying the throne. This unprecedented event illustrates the extraordinary political power wielded by the Guard at that time.

== Downfall under Septimius Severus ==
When Septimius Severus marched on Rome to seize power, he ordered the execution of Laetus and other conspirators involved in Commodus’ assassination and the auction of the empire, viewing them as potential threats.

== Legacy ==
Laetus’ career demonstrates both the power and the volatility of the Praetorian Guard during the late 2nd century CE. His involvement in the fall of Commodus and the brief civil wars of 193 CE remains one of the most notable episodes of instability in Roman imperial history.

== Media portrayals ==
Laetus appears in the 2005 PlayStation 2 video game Colosseum: Road to Freedom as a key antagonist.

A character named Quintus, portrayed by Tomas Arana in the 2000 film Gladiator, is loosely based on Laetus, serving as a Praetorian Guard officer.
