= AD 144 =

144 in various calendars
- Gregorian calendar: 144; CXLIV
- Ab urbe condita: 897
- Assyrian calendar: 4894
- Balinese saka calendar: 65–66
- Bengali calendar: −450 – −449
- Berber calendar: 1094
- Buddhist calendar: 688
- Burmese calendar: −494
- Byzantine calendar: 5652–5653
- Chinese calendar: 癸未年 (Water Goat); 2841 or 2634 — to — 甲申年 (Wood Monkey); 2842 or 2635
- Coptic calendar: −140 – −139
- Discordian calendar: 1310
- Ethiopian calendar: 136–137
- Hebrew calendar: 3904–3905
- Hindu calendars
- Vikram Samvat: 200–201
- Shaka Samvat: 65–66
- Kali Yuga: 3244–3245
- Holocene calendar: 10144
- Iranian calendar: 478 BP – 477 BP
- Islamic calendar: 493 BH – 492 BH
- Javanese calendar: 19–20
- Julian calendar: 144; CXLIV
- Korean calendar: 2477
- Minguo calendar: 1768 before ROC 民前1768年
- Nanakshahi calendar: −1324
- Seleucid era: 455/456 AG
- Thai solar calendar: 686–687
- Tibetan calendar: ཆུ་མོ་ལུག་ལོ་ (female Water-Sheep); 270 or −111 or −883 — to — ཤིང་ཕོ་སྤྲེ་ལོ་ (male Wood-Monkey); 271 or −110 or −882

Year 144 (CXLIV) was a leap year starting on Tuesday of the Julian calendar. At the time, it was known as the Year of the Consulship of Rufus and Maximus (or, less frequently, year 897 Ab urbe condita). The denomination 144 for this year has been used since the early medieval period, when the Anno Domini calendar era became the prevalent method in Europe for naming years.

== Events ==
=== By place ===
==== Roman Empire ====
- Lucius Hedius Rufus Lollianus Avitus and Titus Statilius Maximus become Roman Consuls.
- The Roman campaigns in Mauretania begin.

==== Asia ====
- Change of era name from Hanan (3rd year) to Jiankang era of the Chinese Han dynasty.
- Change of emperor from Han Shundi to Han Chongdi of the Han dynasty.
- In Vietnam during the second Era of Northern Domination, rebellion of Cham people broke out in Jiaozhi and Jiuzhen. The rebels then surrendered to the Jiaozhi's governor in the same year.
- Reign of Huvishka, emperor of the Kushan Empire.

=== By topic ===
==== Religion ====
- Change of Patriarch of Constantinople from Polycarpus II to Athendodorus (until 148).
- Marcion of Sinope is excommunicated; a sect, Marcionism, grows out of his beliefs.

== Births ==
- Kahiko-Lue-Mea, Hawaiian ruler

== Deaths ==
- September 20 – Han Shundi, Chinese emperor (b. 115)
- Polemon of Laodicea, Greek sophist (b. c. AD 90)
