= Battle of Cyzicus (193) =

Battle between Septimius Severus and Pescennius Niger (193)

Coordinates: 40°22′48″N 27°53′24″E

The Battle of Cyzicus was fought in 193 between the forces of Septimius Severus and his rival for the empire, Pescennius Niger, who was defeated.

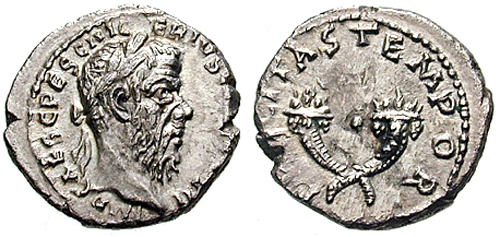
Pescennius Niger. 193–194 AD. AR Denarius. Antioch mint.

The battle took place in the context of the Year of the Five Emperors, a tumultuous period in the Roman Empire when Emperor Pertinax was assassinated by the Praetorian Guards. The Praetorian Guards then held an auction for the throne, which was won by Didius Julianus, who became emperor. The auction was unpopular, and Septimius Severus and Pescennius Niger, the governor of Syria (as well as Clodius Albinus, the governor of Britain) all claimed the Roman imperial throne after the auction.

Severus marched to Rome and had Didius decapitated, then marched to meet Pescennius in battle.

The battle was fought near Cyzicus in Asia Minor.
