= Publius Cornelius Anullinus =

Late 2nd century Roman general and governor

Publius Cornelius Anullinus (or, occasionally, Anulinus) was one of the generals of the Roman emperor Septimius Severus. He was from the city of Iliberis (Granada, or identified by modern scholars as likely being in or near Albayzín), and, while there is no clear information around this, it is believed he was not of a patrician family but was one of the equites.

Anullinus served as the governor of the Roman province of Hispania Baetica in 170, and the later emperor Severus would serve under him as quaestor. It is believed (though there is no documentary evidence of this) that the two had met earlier in Rome, and Severus served at Anullinus's request. He may (or may not) have been legate of the Roman province of Africa proconsularis in 193.

Anullinus took command from Tiberius Claudius Candidus of Severus' field army in the war against Pescennius Niger in 193. In the following year he delivered a crushing defeat to Niger at the Battle of Issus, during the Year of the Five Emperors. Anullinus must have reached consular rank before the year 196 since he was praefectus urbi of Rome that year. He afterwards commanded one of the divisions of the army which Severus sent against the city of Adiabene, in 197. He was made consul a second time in 199.

His family must have retained favour with Severus' son and successor Caracalla, since a different Publius Cornelius Anulinus was consul ordinarius with Publius Catius Sabinus in the year 216.

== Notes ==
Political offices
Preceded by Quintus Anicius Faustus, and ignotus as Suffect consuls	Consul of the Roman Empire; 199 with Marcus Aufidius Fronto	Succeeded by Tiberius Claudius Severus Proculus, and Gaius Aufidius Victorinus as Suffect consuls
