= AD 180 =

180 in various calendars
- Gregorian calendar: 180; CLXXX
- Ab urbe condita: 933
- Assyrian calendar: 4930
- Balinese saka calendar: 101–102
- Bengali calendar: −414 – −413
- Berber calendar: 1130
- Buddhist calendar: 724
- Burmese calendar: −458
- Byzantine calendar: 5688–5689
- Chinese calendar: 己未年 (Earth Goat); 2877 or 2670 — to — 庚申年 (Metal Monkey); 2878 or 2671
- Coptic calendar: −104 – −103
- Discordian calendar: 1346
- Ethiopian calendar: 172–173
- Hebrew calendar: 3940–3941
- Hindu calendars
- Vikram Samvat: 236–237
- Shaka Samvat: 101–102
- Kali Yuga: 3280–3281
- Holocene calendar: 10180
- Iranian calendar: 442 BP – 441 BP
- Islamic calendar: 456 BH – 455 BH
- Javanese calendar: 56–57
- Julian calendar: 180; CLXXX
- Korean calendar: 2513
- Minguo calendar: 1732 before ROC 民前1732年
- Nanakshahi calendar: −1288
- Seleucid era: 491/492 AG
- Thai solar calendar: 722–723
- Tibetan calendar: ས་མོ་ལུག་ལོ་ (female Earth-Sheep); 306 or −75 or −847 — to — ལྕགས་ཕོ་སྤྲེ་ལོ་ (male Iron-Monkey); 307 or −74 or −846

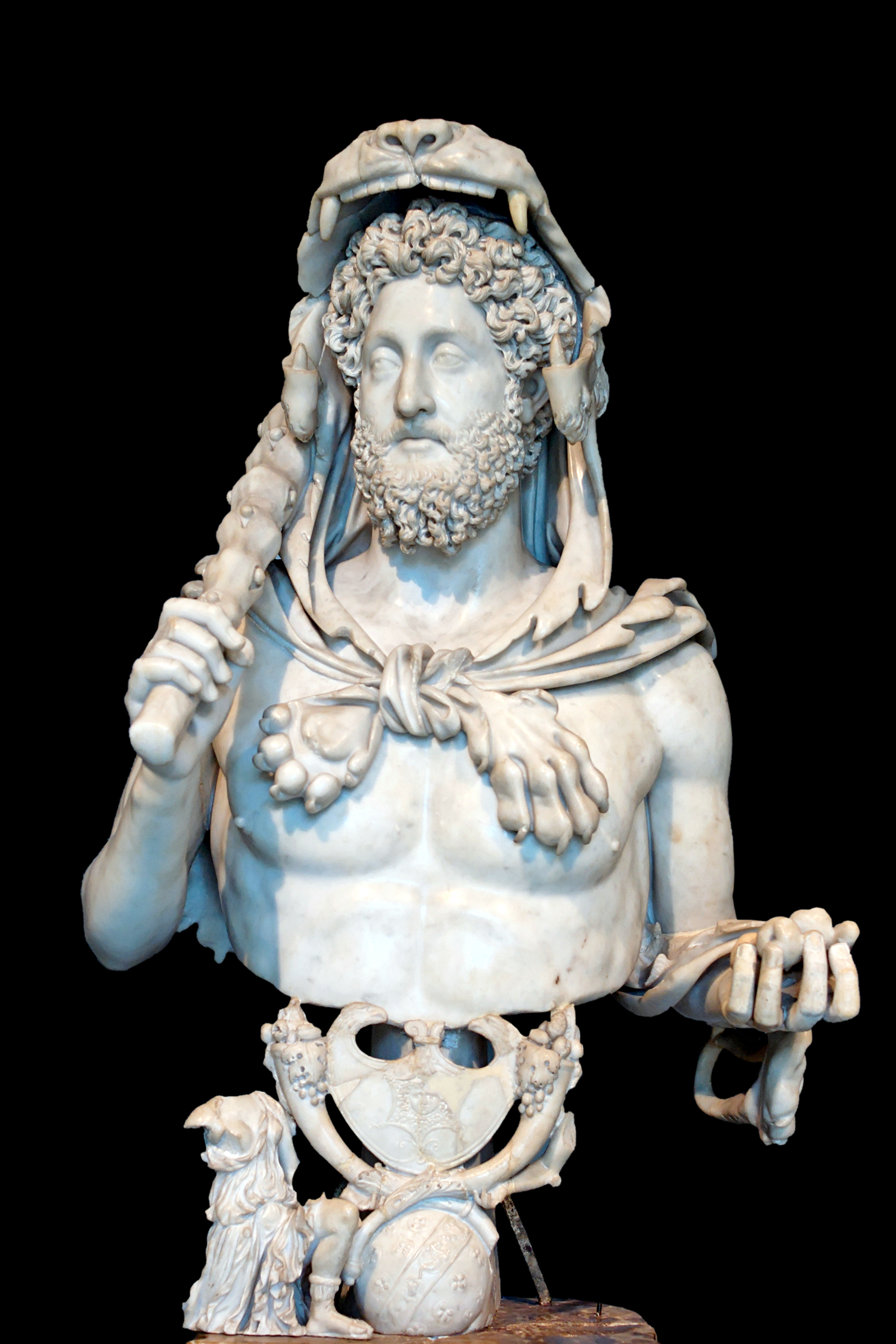
Emperor Commodus as Hercules

Year 180 (CLXXX) was a leap year starting on Friday of the Julian calendar. At the time, it was known as the Year of the Consulship of Rusticus and Condianus (or, less frequently, year 933 Ab urbe condita). The denomination 180 for this year has been used since the early medieval period, when the Anno Domini calendar era became the prevalent method in Europe for naming years.

== Events ==
=== By place ===
==== Roman Empire ====
- The Quadi are chased westwards, deeper into Germania. The Praetorian prefect, Tarutenius Paternus, achieves a decisive victory against the Germanic tribes.
- March 17 – Emperor Marcus Aurelius dies after a week's illness at his camp in Vindobona (modern Vienna). He is succeeded by his son Commodus (age 18).
- The Era of the Five Good Emperors ends.
- Rome creates a 4-mile wide buffer zone by the Danube.
- Work begins in Rome on the building of the Column of Marcus Aurelius.
- 180–395 – Late Empire in Rome.
- Northern British from beyond Hadrian's Wall invade the North of modern-day England, causing Emperor Commodus to allow swathes of Northern cities to establish city walls.
- Cassius Dio arrives in Rome and becomes a Senator

==== Europe ====
- The Goths reach the banks of the Black Sea.

==== Oceania ====
- Lake Taupō in New Zealand erupts, forming ash clouds as far as China and Europe.

=== By topic ===
==== Arts and sciences ====
- In his Methodus Medendo, Greek physician Galen describes the connection between paralysis and the severing of the spinal cord.
- Galen's popular work on hygiene is published.

==== Religion ====
- July 17 – Twelve Christian inhabitants of Scillium in Numidia are executed in Carthage (also in North Africa) (known as the Scillitan Martyrs) – they had refused to swear an oath to the Emperor.
- Commodus creates an official cult of the Zoroastrian god Mithra.

== Births ==
- Ardashir I, founder of the Sasanian Empire (d. 242)
- Johanan bar Nappaha, Jewish rabbi (d. 279)
- Julia Soaemias, mother of Elagabalus (d. 222)
- Sima Fu, Chinese prince and statesman (d. 272)

== Deaths ==
- March 17 – Marcus Aurelius, Roman emperor (b. 121)
- Aulus Gellius, Roman author and grammarian (b. 125 AD)
- Gaius, Roman jurist and writer (approximate date)
- Hegesippus, Christian chronicler and writer (b. 110)
- Lucian of Samosata, Syrian rhetorician (b. 125 AD)
- Melito of Sardis, bishop of Sardis (approximate date)
- Pinytus, bishop of Knossos (approximate date)
