= Clodius Albinus =

Roman Emperor in 193

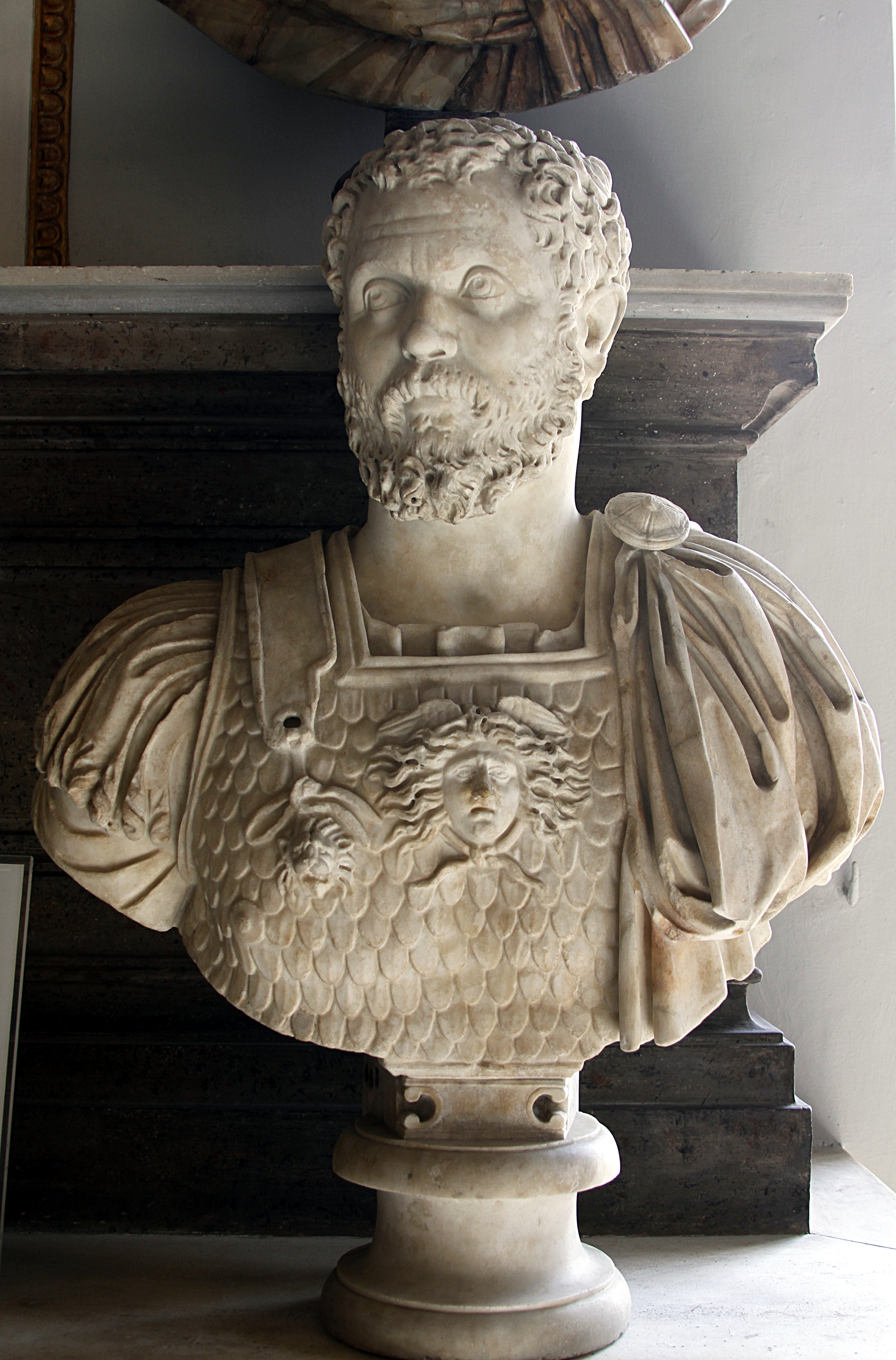
- Bust in the Capitoline Museums, Rome
- Born: c. 150; Hadrumetum, Roman Africa (Sousse, Tunisia)
- Died: 19 February 197 (aged c. 47); Lugdunum
Names
- Decimus Clodius Albinus (before 193); Decimus Clodius Septimius Albinus
Regnal name
- Imperator Caesar Decimus Clodius Septimius Albinus Augustus

Decimus Clodius Albinus (c. 150 – 19 February 197) was a Roman imperial pretender between 193 and 197. He was proclaimed emperor by the legions in Britain and Hispania after the murder of Pertinax in 193 (known as the "Year of the Five Emperors"). Initially Albinus cooperated with another contender for the throne, Septimius Severus, but the two turned on each other in 196 and commenced a civil war. Albinus died in battle the following year.

== Biography ==
=== Early life ===
Albinus was born in Hadrumetum, Africa Province (Sousse, Tunisia) to an aristocratic Roman family. The unreliable Historia Augusta claims his parents' names were Aurelia Messallina and Ceionius Postumus, along with other relatives mentioned in Vita Albini. None of these names are considered likely to be accurate by modern historians. The text also claims that Clodius received the cognomen Albinus because of the extraordinary whiteness of his complexion.

=== Career under Marcus Aurelius and Commodus ===
Showing a disposition for military life, he entered the army when very young and served with distinction, especially in 175 during the rebellion of Avidius Cassius against Emperor Marcus Aurelius. His merit was acknowledged by the Emperor in two letters in which he calls Albinus an African, who resembled his countrymen but little, and who was praiseworthy for his military experience and the gravity of his character. The Emperor likewise declared that without Albinus the legions (in Bithynia) would have gone over to Avidius Cassius, and that he intended to have him chosen consul.

The Emperor Commodus gave Albinus a command in Gallia Belgica and afterwards in Britain. A false rumor having been spread that Commodus had died, Albinus denounced the man before his soldiers in Britain, calling Commodus a tyrant, and maintaining that it would be useful to the Roman Empire to restore to the Senate its ancient dignity and power. The Senate was very pleased with these sentiments, but not so the Emperor, who sent Junius Severus to relieve Albinus of his command. Despite this, Albinus kept his command until after the murders of Commodus and his successor Pertinax in 193.

=== Alliance with Septimius Severus ===
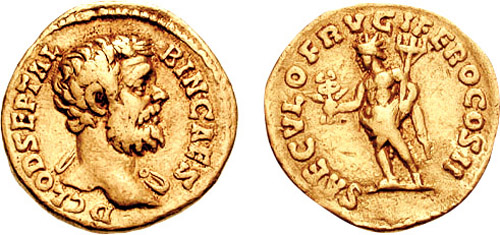
Coin of Clodius Albinus (Note: This coin celebrates Saeculum Frugiferum, the embodiment of a "fruitful era", probably Baal Hammon, a Phoenician divinity worshipped in North Africa, where Clodius came from.)

After Pertinax was assassinated, the praetorian prefect Aemilius Laetus and his men, who had arranged the murder, "sold" the imperial throne to wealthy senator Didius Julianus, effectively crowning him emperor. A string of mutinies by the troops in the provinces, however, meant the next emperor was far from decided. Pescennius Niger was proclaimed emperor by the legions in Syria; Septimius Severus by the troops in Illyricum and Pannonia; and Albinus by the armies in Britain and Gaul.

In the civil war that followed, Albinus was initially allied with Septimius Severus, who had captured Rome. Albinus added the name Septimius to his own, and accepted the title of Caesar from him; the two shared a consulship in 194. Albinus remained effective ruler of much of the western part of the Empire, with support from three British legions and one Spanish. (Note: The British legions were II Augusta, VI Victrix, and XX Valeria Victrix, the Spanish legion was the VII Gemina.) When Didius Julianus was put to death by order of the Senate, who dreaded the power of Septimius Severus, the latter turned his arms against Pescennius Niger. After the defeat and death of Niger in 194, and the complete discomfiture of his adherents, especially after the fall of Byzantium in 196, Severus resolved to make himself the absolute master of the Roman Empire. Albinus, seeing the danger of his position, prepared for resistance. He narrowly escaped being assassinated by a messenger of Severus, after which he put himself at the head of his army, which is said to have consisted of 150,000 men.

=== Declaring himself emperor ===
In autumn 196, Albinus received word that Severus had appointed his elder son Caracalla as his successor with the title of Caesar and convinced the Senate to declare Albinus himself an official enemy of Rome. Now with nothing to lose, Albinus mobilized his legions in Britannia, proclaimed himself emperor (Imperator Caesar Decimus Clodius Septimius Albinus Augustus) and crossed from Britain to Gaul, bringing a large part of the British garrison with him. (Note: Indeed, he stripped Britain of every available soldier, which meant that Severus' new administration had to deal with several rebellions, including those of the Maeatae.) He defeated Severus' legate Virius Lupus, and was able to lay claim to the military resources of Gaul, but although he made Lugdunum the headquarters of his forces, he was unable to win the allegiance of the Rhine legions.

On 19 February 197 Albinus met Severus' army at the Battle of Lugdunum. After a hard-fought battle, with 150,000 troops on both sides according to Cassius Dio, Albinus was defeated and killed himself, or was captured and executed on the orders of Severus. Severus had his naked body laid out on the ground before him, so that he could ride his horse over it, in a final act of humiliation. Albinus' wife and two sons were initially pardoned by Severus, but he changed his mind almost immediately afterwards, for as the dead Albinus was beheaded, so were they. Albinus' headless body was thrown into the Rhône, together with the corpses of his murdered family. Severus sent his head to Rome as a warning to his supporters; with it he sent an insolent letter, in which he mocked the Senate for their loyalty to Albinus. The town of Lugdunum was plundered, and the adherents of Albinus were cruelly persecuted by Severus.

== Personal life ==
It is said that he wrote a treatise on agriculture and a collection of Milesian tales.

The name of Albinus' wife is unknown, (Note: In the past some have thought that she might have been Pescennia Plautiana; this name has also been ascribed to a possible wife or daughter of Pescennius Niger. The woman may be entirely fictional and created by coin forgers. Anthony Birley has proposed that she may have been an Asellia, a relative of Asellius Aemilianus. Alexander Mlasowsky and Dietmar Kienast also found this plausible.) and only the unreliable Historia Augusta mention any name for his sons, claiming that he had an infant son named Pescennius Princus, (Note: The name "Princus" may have been a mistake for Prineus, Primus or Priscus.) but some historians such as Anthony Birley hold that this name is fictitious.

== Notes ==
Political offices
Preceded by Pertinax	Governor of Britain; 191–197	Succeeded by Virius Lupus
Preceded by L. Fabius Cilo; G. Aemilius Severus Cantabrinus	Roman consul 194; With: Septimius Severus	Succeeded by P. Julius Scapula Tertullus Priscus; Q. Tineius Clemens
Regnal titles
Preceded by Didius Julianus	Roman emperor 193 in competition with Pescennius Niger and Septimius Severus	Succeeded by Septimius Severus
