= Pertinax =

Roman emperor in 193

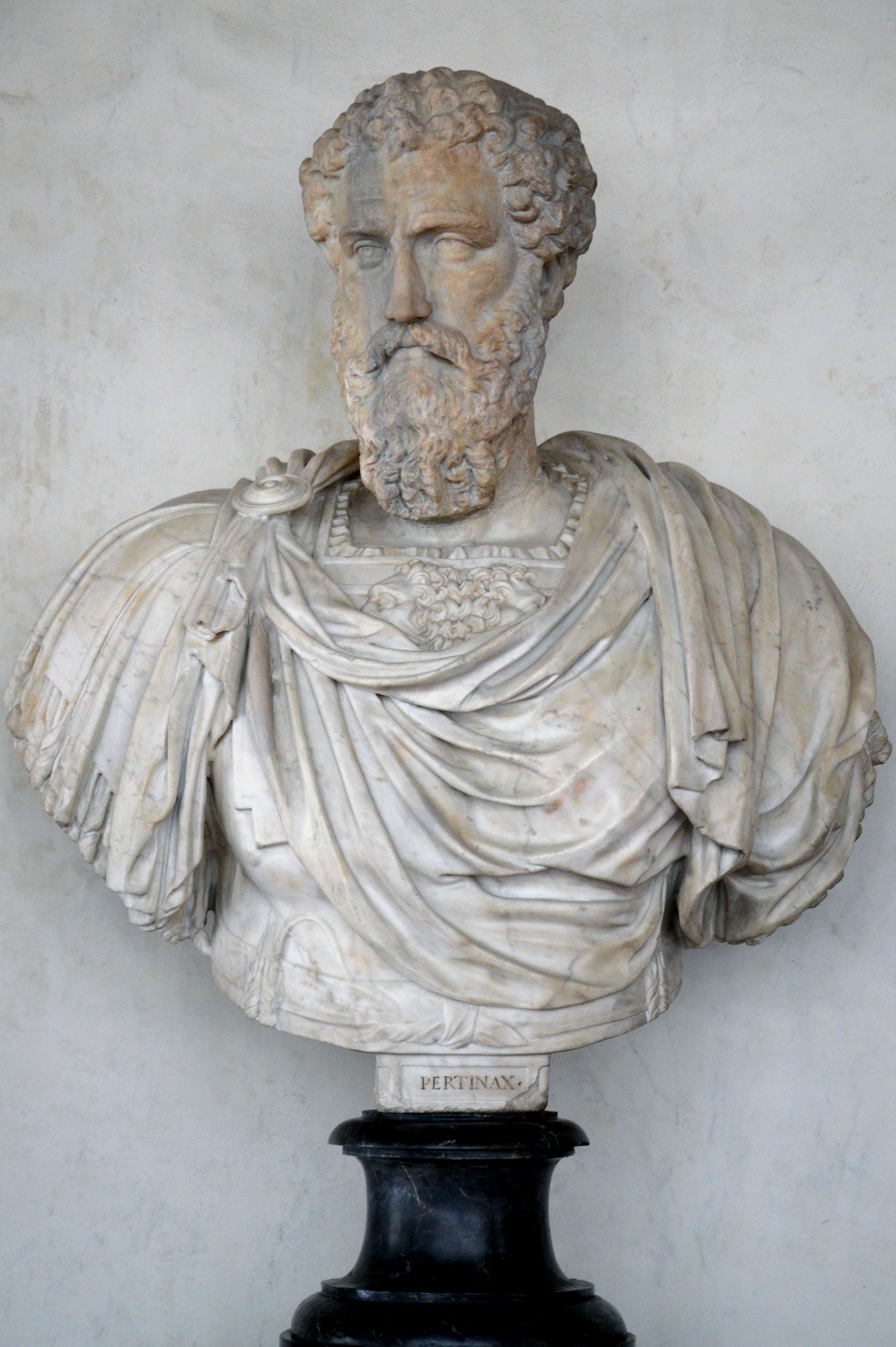
- Bust, Galleria degli Uffizi, Florence

Roman emperor
- Reign: 1 January – 28 March 193
- Predecessor: Commodus
- Successor: Didius Julianus
- Born: 1 August 126; Alba Pompeia, Italy
- Died: 28 March 193 (aged 66); Rome, Italy
- Burial: Rome
- Spouse: Flavia Titiana
- Issue: Helvius Pertinax, caesar Helvia
Names
- Publius Helvius Pertinax
Regnal name
- Imperator Caesar Publius Helvius Pertinax Augustus
- Father: Helvius Successus

Publius Helvius Pertinax (/ˈpɜːrtɪnæks/ PER-tin-ax; 1 August 126 – 28 March 193) was Roman emperor for the first three months of 193, succeeding Commodus and becoming the first ruler of the turbulent Year of the Five Emperors.

The son of a freedman, Pertinax rose from modest origins through a military career. He distinguished himself in the Roman–Parthian War of 161–166 and went on to hold a succession of governorships and senior commands. He also sat in the Roman Senate, where he was a contemporary of the historian Cassius Dio.

After the assassination of Commodus, Pertinax was chosen emperor. He aimed at restoring army discipline and imperial financial stability, but his reforms angered the Praetorian Guard, who killed him after just 87 days. He was later deified by Septimius Severus, who promoted his memory as part of his own rise to power. Ancient and modern assessments generally view Pertinax as a capable and conscientious ruler undone by circumstances.

== Early life and career ==
Pertinax’s background is recorded in the Historia Augusta and in Cassius Dio’s Roman History, with many details supported by inscriptions. The son of Helvius Successus, a freedman, he was born on 1 August 126 in Alba Pompeia in northern Italy. According to Dio, Successus was born in modest circumstances but gave his son an education enough for advancement in Roman life. With the support of a patron—either Lucius Avitus or Tiberius Claudius Pompeianus—Pertinax obtained a commission as a cohort officer.

He won distinction in the Parthian War, where he earned rapid promotion. He later served in Roman Britain as tribune of the Legio VI Victrix and along the Danube frontier, and then as procurator in Dacia. Though briefly sidelined by court politics under Marcus Aurelius, he was recalled for the Marcomannic Wars and made suffect consul in 175.

Between 175 and 185, he governed a series of provinces including Upper and Lower Moesia, Dacia, Syria, and finally Britain. In Britain his strict discipline provoked hostility; mutinous soldiers once left him for dead, and he was forced to resign in 187. He later served as proconsul of Africa (188–189), then as urban prefect of Rome, and finally consul again in 192 with Commodus as colleague.

== Emperor ==
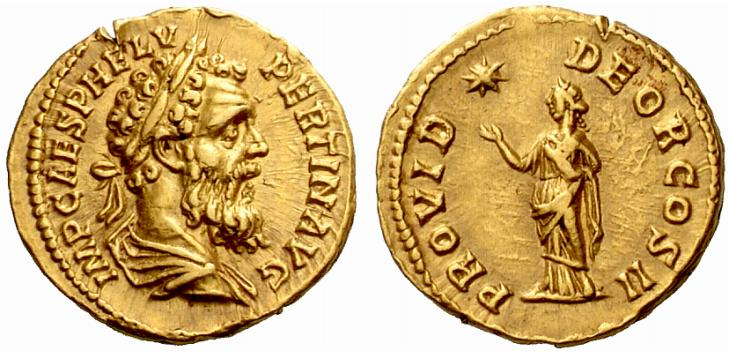
Roman aureus struck under Pertinax: IMP. CAES. P. HELV. PERTIN. AVG. / PROVIDentia DEORum COnSul II

=== Rise to power ===
After Commodus was assassinated by a palace conspiracy involving the praetorian prefect Quintus Aemilius Laetus, his mistress Marcia, and his chamberlain Eclectus, on 31 December 192, Pertinax, then urban prefect, was taken to the Praetorian camp and acclaimed emperor.

=== Reign and downfall ===
Reigning only 87 days, he attempted to emulate Marcus Aurelius in restraint and reform. He tightened discipline in the Praetorian Guard, tried to regulate the alimenta (a state welfare scheme), and improved the coinage by raising the silver content of the denarius from 74% to 87%. His efforts, however, met resistance. The Guard resented the modest donativum on his accession and demanded more, forcing him to sell off Commodus’ property and concubines. In March, a failed coup sought to replace him with the consul Quintus Pompeius Sosius Falco.

On 28 March 193, around 200–300 praetorians stormed the palace. Abandoned by his guards and betrayed by Laetus, Pertinax attempted to reason with them, but was cut down. Cassius Dio praised his courage but noted the futility of confronting enraged soldiers.

== Aftermath ==
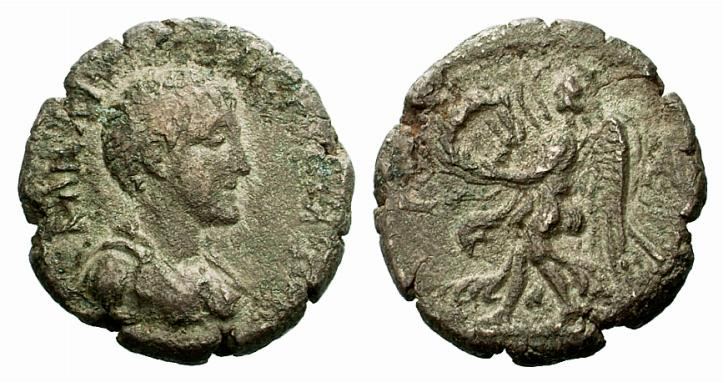
Coin of Pertinax's son with legend "KAI[C]AP [ΠΕΡΤΙΝΑΞ]" (Caesar Pertinax)

After Pertinax's death, the Guard notoriously auctioned the throne, which was purchased by Didius Julianus. Julianus lasted only weeks before being replaced by Septimius Severus, who honoured Pertinax by executing his killers, securing his deification, and adopting "Pertinax" into his own name.

== Historical reputation ==
Cassius Dio, who knew him personally, called him "an excellent and upright man" who governed with integrity and frugality. He criticised only the haste of his reforms, which provoked resentment and led to his downfall.

Later writers echoed this assessment. Niccolò Machiavelli cited him in The Prince as a good ruler fatally undermined by trying to reform corrupt soldiers too quickly. David Hume praised him as an "excellent prince". In 1788, at the Virginia Ratifying Convention, John Dawson referred to Pertinax’s murder as a warning against standing armies.

== In popular culture ==
The French journalist André Géraud (1882–1974) wrote under the pseudonym “Pertinax”.

In the alternate history novel Romanitas by Sophia McDougall, Pertinax survives the coup and enacts reforms that preserve the Roman Empire into the modern age.

The UK's oldest gorilla, Pertinax who died aged 42 at Paignton Zoo in Devon, was named after the emperor.

== Sources ==
=== Primary sources ===
- Historia Augusta, Life of Pertinax, English translation at Lacus Curtius
- Herodian, History of the Roman Empire, English translation at Lacus Curtius
- Cassius Dio, Roman History, Book 74, English translation at The Tertullian Project
- Aurelius Victor, "Epitome de Caesaribus", English translation at De Imperatoribus Romanis
- Zosimus, "Historia Nova", English translation at The Tertullian Project

=== Secondary sources ===
- Birley, Anthony (2005). The Roman Government of Britain. Oxford University Press. ISBN 9780199252374.
- Campbell, Brian (2005). "The Severan dynasty". In Alan K. Bowman; Peter Garnsey & Averil Cameron (eds.). The Cambridge Ancient History XII: The Crisis of Empire, A.D. 193–337 (2nd ed.). Cambridge University Press.
- Elliott, Simon (2020). Pertinax: The Son of a Slave Who Became Roman Emperor. Greenhill Books. ISBN 9781784385255.
- Gibbon, Edward (1788). The History of the Decline and Fall of the Roman Empire.
- Meckler, Michael L. (1997). "Pertinax (193 A.D.)". De Imperatoribus Romanis.
- Pococke, Edward (1853). The History of the Roman Empire from the Time of Vespasian to the Extinction of the Western Empire. London.

Political offices
Preceded by L. Calpurnius Piso; P. Salvius Julianus	Roman consul 175 (suffect); With: Didius Julianus	Succeeded by T. Vitrasius Pollio; M. Flavius Aper II
Preceded by Ulpius Marcellus	Governor of Britain c. 185 – 187	Succeeded by Unknown, then Clodius Albinus
Preceded by Popilius Pedo Apronianus; M. Valerius Bradua Mauricus	Roman consul 192; With: Commodus VII	Succeeded by Q. Pompeius Sosius Falco; G. Julius Erucius Clarus Vibianus
Regnal titles
Preceded by Commodus	Roman emperor 193	Succeeded by Didius Julianus
